

71001–71100 

|-bgcolor=#E9E9E9
| 71001 Natspasoc ||  ||  || December 7, 1999 || Fountain Hills || C. W. Juels || MAR || align=right | 5.3 km || 
|-id=002 bgcolor=#E9E9E9
| 71002 ||  || — || December 7, 1999 || Črni Vrh || Črni Vrh || — || align=right | 6.4 km || 
|-id=003 bgcolor=#d6d6d6
| 71003 ||  || — || December 3, 1999 || Uenohara || N. Kawasato || KAR || align=right | 3.5 km || 
|-id=004 bgcolor=#E9E9E9
| 71004 ||  || — || December 3, 1999 || Nachi-Katsuura || Y. Shimizu, T. Urata || — || align=right | 3.3 km || 
|-id=005 bgcolor=#E9E9E9
| 71005 ||  || — || December 7, 1999 || Socorro || LINEAR || — || align=right | 4.4 km || 
|-id=006 bgcolor=#E9E9E9
| 71006 ||  || — || December 7, 1999 || Socorro || LINEAR || — || align=right | 1.8 km || 
|-id=007 bgcolor=#E9E9E9
| 71007 ||  || — || December 7, 1999 || Socorro || LINEAR || — || align=right | 2.3 km || 
|-id=008 bgcolor=#E9E9E9
| 71008 ||  || — || December 7, 1999 || Socorro || LINEAR || — || align=right | 2.8 km || 
|-id=009 bgcolor=#E9E9E9
| 71009 ||  || — || December 7, 1999 || Socorro || LINEAR || — || align=right | 3.1 km || 
|-id=010 bgcolor=#fefefe
| 71010 ||  || — || December 7, 1999 || Socorro || LINEAR || V || align=right | 2.6 km || 
|-id=011 bgcolor=#E9E9E9
| 71011 ||  || — || December 7, 1999 || Socorro || LINEAR || — || align=right | 4.6 km || 
|-id=012 bgcolor=#E9E9E9
| 71012 ||  || — || December 7, 1999 || Socorro || LINEAR || — || align=right | 3.3 km || 
|-id=013 bgcolor=#E9E9E9
| 71013 ||  || — || December 7, 1999 || Socorro || LINEAR || — || align=right | 3.0 km || 
|-id=014 bgcolor=#E9E9E9
| 71014 ||  || — || December 7, 1999 || Socorro || LINEAR || — || align=right | 4.9 km || 
|-id=015 bgcolor=#E9E9E9
| 71015 ||  || — || December 7, 1999 || Socorro || LINEAR || — || align=right | 4.1 km || 
|-id=016 bgcolor=#E9E9E9
| 71016 ||  || — || December 7, 1999 || Socorro || LINEAR || ADE || align=right | 6.1 km || 
|-id=017 bgcolor=#E9E9E9
| 71017 ||  || — || December 7, 1999 || Socorro || LINEAR || — || align=right | 4.0 km || 
|-id=018 bgcolor=#d6d6d6
| 71018 ||  || — || December 7, 1999 || Socorro || LINEAR || — || align=right | 7.0 km || 
|-id=019 bgcolor=#E9E9E9
| 71019 ||  || — || December 7, 1999 || Socorro || LINEAR || — || align=right | 3.5 km || 
|-id=020 bgcolor=#E9E9E9
| 71020 ||  || — || December 7, 1999 || Socorro || LINEAR || — || align=right | 2.7 km || 
|-id=021 bgcolor=#E9E9E9
| 71021 ||  || — || December 7, 1999 || Socorro || LINEAR || — || align=right | 2.6 km || 
|-id=022 bgcolor=#E9E9E9
| 71022 ||  || — || December 7, 1999 || Socorro || LINEAR || — || align=right | 4.5 km || 
|-id=023 bgcolor=#E9E9E9
| 71023 ||  || — || December 7, 1999 || Socorro || LINEAR || — || align=right | 3.2 km || 
|-id=024 bgcolor=#E9E9E9
| 71024 ||  || — || December 7, 1999 || Socorro || LINEAR || — || align=right | 4.6 km || 
|-id=025 bgcolor=#E9E9E9
| 71025 ||  || — || December 7, 1999 || Socorro || LINEAR || ADE || align=right | 6.0 km || 
|-id=026 bgcolor=#E9E9E9
| 71026 ||  || — || December 7, 1999 || Socorro || LINEAR || — || align=right | 2.6 km || 
|-id=027 bgcolor=#E9E9E9
| 71027 ||  || — || December 7, 1999 || Socorro || LINEAR || — || align=right | 4.4 km || 
|-id=028 bgcolor=#E9E9E9
| 71028 ||  || — || December 7, 1999 || Socorro || LINEAR || — || align=right | 3.4 km || 
|-id=029 bgcolor=#E9E9E9
| 71029 ||  || — || December 7, 1999 || Socorro || LINEAR || — || align=right | 3.7 km || 
|-id=030 bgcolor=#E9E9E9
| 71030 ||  || — || December 7, 1999 || Socorro || LINEAR || EUN || align=right | 5.2 km || 
|-id=031 bgcolor=#d6d6d6
| 71031 ||  || — || December 7, 1999 || Socorro || LINEAR || KAR || align=right | 3.3 km || 
|-id=032 bgcolor=#E9E9E9
| 71032 ||  || — || December 7, 1999 || Socorro || LINEAR || — || align=right | 3.6 km || 
|-id=033 bgcolor=#d6d6d6
| 71033 ||  || — || December 7, 1999 || Socorro || LINEAR || KOR || align=right | 3.4 km || 
|-id=034 bgcolor=#E9E9E9
| 71034 ||  || — || December 7, 1999 || Socorro || LINEAR || — || align=right | 2.8 km || 
|-id=035 bgcolor=#E9E9E9
| 71035 ||  || — || December 7, 1999 || Socorro || LINEAR || — || align=right | 5.3 km || 
|-id=036 bgcolor=#E9E9E9
| 71036 ||  || — || December 7, 1999 || Socorro || LINEAR || — || align=right | 3.2 km || 
|-id=037 bgcolor=#E9E9E9
| 71037 ||  || — || December 7, 1999 || Socorro || LINEAR || — || align=right | 3.4 km || 
|-id=038 bgcolor=#E9E9E9
| 71038 ||  || — || December 7, 1999 || Socorro || LINEAR || PAD || align=right | 4.3 km || 
|-id=039 bgcolor=#E9E9E9
| 71039 ||  || — || December 7, 1999 || Socorro || LINEAR || — || align=right | 6.2 km || 
|-id=040 bgcolor=#E9E9E9
| 71040 ||  || — || December 7, 1999 || Socorro || LINEAR || — || align=right | 4.0 km || 
|-id=041 bgcolor=#d6d6d6
| 71041 ||  || — || December 7, 1999 || Socorro || LINEAR || EOS || align=right | 5.9 km || 
|-id=042 bgcolor=#E9E9E9
| 71042 ||  || — || December 7, 1999 || Socorro || LINEAR || MIT || align=right | 6.4 km || 
|-id=043 bgcolor=#E9E9E9
| 71043 ||  || — || December 7, 1999 || Socorro || LINEAR || — || align=right | 4.3 km || 
|-id=044 bgcolor=#d6d6d6
| 71044 ||  || — || December 7, 1999 || Socorro || LINEAR || — || align=right | 3.3 km || 
|-id=045 bgcolor=#E9E9E9
| 71045 ||  || — || December 7, 1999 || Socorro || LINEAR || — || align=right | 5.4 km || 
|-id=046 bgcolor=#d6d6d6
| 71046 ||  || — || December 7, 1999 || Socorro || LINEAR || — || align=right | 5.6 km || 
|-id=047 bgcolor=#E9E9E9
| 71047 ||  || — || December 7, 1999 || Socorro || LINEAR || — || align=right | 3.2 km || 
|-id=048 bgcolor=#E9E9E9
| 71048 ||  || — || December 7, 1999 || Socorro || LINEAR || — || align=right | 5.5 km || 
|-id=049 bgcolor=#d6d6d6
| 71049 ||  || — || December 7, 1999 || Socorro || LINEAR || KOR || align=right | 5.4 km || 
|-id=050 bgcolor=#d6d6d6
| 71050 ||  || — || December 7, 1999 || Socorro || LINEAR || — || align=right | 5.5 km || 
|-id=051 bgcolor=#d6d6d6
| 71051 ||  || — || December 7, 1999 || Socorro || LINEAR || KOR || align=right | 4.2 km || 
|-id=052 bgcolor=#E9E9E9
| 71052 ||  || — || December 7, 1999 || Socorro || LINEAR || — || align=right | 6.1 km || 
|-id=053 bgcolor=#d6d6d6
| 71053 ||  || — || December 7, 1999 || Socorro || LINEAR || KOR || align=right | 2.9 km || 
|-id=054 bgcolor=#E9E9E9
| 71054 ||  || — || December 7, 1999 || Socorro || LINEAR || — || align=right | 4.6 km || 
|-id=055 bgcolor=#E9E9E9
| 71055 ||  || — || December 7, 1999 || Socorro || LINEAR || GEF || align=right | 3.1 km || 
|-id=056 bgcolor=#E9E9E9
| 71056 ||  || — || December 9, 1999 || Oizumi || T. Kobayashi || MRX || align=right | 3.1 km || 
|-id=057 bgcolor=#E9E9E9
| 71057 ||  || — || December 7, 1999 || Socorro || LINEAR || — || align=right | 4.9 km || 
|-id=058 bgcolor=#E9E9E9
| 71058 ||  || — || December 7, 1999 || Socorro || LINEAR || ADE || align=right | 5.3 km || 
|-id=059 bgcolor=#E9E9E9
| 71059 ||  || — || December 7, 1999 || Socorro || LINEAR || GEF || align=right | 3.1 km || 
|-id=060 bgcolor=#d6d6d6
| 71060 ||  || — || December 7, 1999 || Socorro || LINEAR || — || align=right | 5.7 km || 
|-id=061 bgcolor=#d6d6d6
| 71061 ||  || — || December 7, 1999 || Socorro || LINEAR || — || align=right | 7.2 km || 
|-id=062 bgcolor=#E9E9E9
| 71062 ||  || — || December 7, 1999 || Socorro || LINEAR || — || align=right | 3.5 km || 
|-id=063 bgcolor=#d6d6d6
| 71063 ||  || — || December 7, 1999 || Socorro || LINEAR || EOS || align=right | 7.8 km || 
|-id=064 bgcolor=#E9E9E9
| 71064 ||  || — || December 8, 1999 || Socorro || LINEAR || — || align=right | 3.3 km || 
|-id=065 bgcolor=#E9E9E9
| 71065 ||  || — || December 11, 1999 || Oizumi || T. Kobayashi || — || align=right | 2.3 km || 
|-id=066 bgcolor=#E9E9E9
| 71066 ||  || — || December 4, 1999 || Catalina || CSS || MAR || align=right | 3.3 km || 
|-id=067 bgcolor=#E9E9E9
| 71067 ||  || — || December 4, 1999 || Catalina || CSS || — || align=right | 4.0 km || 
|-id=068 bgcolor=#E9E9E9
| 71068 ||  || — || December 4, 1999 || Catalina || CSS || — || align=right | 5.6 km || 
|-id=069 bgcolor=#E9E9E9
| 71069 ||  || — || December 4, 1999 || Catalina || CSS || — || align=right | 2.5 km || 
|-id=070 bgcolor=#d6d6d6
| 71070 ||  || — || December 7, 1999 || Socorro || LINEAR || — || align=right | 5.7 km || 
|-id=071 bgcolor=#E9E9E9
| 71071 ||  || — || December 10, 1999 || Socorro || LINEAR || — || align=right | 4.8 km || 
|-id=072 bgcolor=#d6d6d6
| 71072 ||  || — || December 10, 1999 || Socorro || LINEAR || — || align=right | 8.9 km || 
|-id=073 bgcolor=#E9E9E9
| 71073 ||  || — || December 11, 1999 || Socorro || LINEAR || HNS || align=right | 3.0 km || 
|-id=074 bgcolor=#E9E9E9
| 71074 ||  || — || December 5, 1999 || Catalina || CSS || — || align=right | 3.5 km || 
|-id=075 bgcolor=#E9E9E9
| 71075 ||  || — || December 5, 1999 || Catalina || CSS || — || align=right | 6.4 km || 
|-id=076 bgcolor=#E9E9E9
| 71076 ||  || — || December 5, 1999 || Catalina || CSS || — || align=right | 3.2 km || 
|-id=077 bgcolor=#fefefe
| 71077 ||  || — || December 5, 1999 || Catalina || CSS || — || align=right | 4.0 km || 
|-id=078 bgcolor=#E9E9E9
| 71078 ||  || — || December 5, 1999 || Catalina || CSS || EUN || align=right | 2.7 km || 
|-id=079 bgcolor=#E9E9E9
| 71079 ||  || — || December 5, 1999 || Catalina || CSS || — || align=right | 2.0 km || 
|-id=080 bgcolor=#E9E9E9
| 71080 ||  || — || December 5, 1999 || Catalina || CSS || RAF || align=right | 2.3 km || 
|-id=081 bgcolor=#E9E9E9
| 71081 ||  || — || December 5, 1999 || Catalina || CSS || — || align=right | 5.6 km || 
|-id=082 bgcolor=#E9E9E9
| 71082 ||  || — || December 5, 1999 || Catalina || CSS || — || align=right | 3.2 km || 
|-id=083 bgcolor=#E9E9E9
| 71083 ||  || — || December 5, 1999 || Catalina || CSS || — || align=right | 3.4 km || 
|-id=084 bgcolor=#E9E9E9
| 71084 ||  || — || December 5, 1999 || Catalina || CSS || — || align=right | 3.3 km || 
|-id=085 bgcolor=#E9E9E9
| 71085 ||  || — || December 7, 1999 || Catalina || CSS || WIT || align=right | 2.0 km || 
|-id=086 bgcolor=#E9E9E9
| 71086 ||  || — || December 7, 1999 || Catalina || CSS || — || align=right | 3.7 km || 
|-id=087 bgcolor=#d6d6d6
| 71087 ||  || — || December 13, 1999 || Ondřejov || P. Kušnirák || URS || align=right | 8.0 km || 
|-id=088 bgcolor=#E9E9E9
| 71088 ||  || — || December 12, 1999 || Socorro || LINEAR || — || align=right | 3.1 km || 
|-id=089 bgcolor=#E9E9E9
| 71089 ||  || — || December 12, 1999 || Socorro || LINEAR || — || align=right | 4.1 km || 
|-id=090 bgcolor=#d6d6d6
| 71090 ||  || — || December 12, 1999 || Socorro || LINEAR || EOS || align=right | 4.8 km || 
|-id=091 bgcolor=#E9E9E9
| 71091 ||  || — || December 12, 1999 || Socorro || LINEAR || — || align=right | 4.4 km || 
|-id=092 bgcolor=#d6d6d6
| 71092 ||  || — || December 12, 1999 || Socorro || LINEAR || — || align=right | 4.5 km || 
|-id=093 bgcolor=#d6d6d6
| 71093 ||  || — || December 12, 1999 || Socorro || LINEAR || — || align=right | 6.7 km || 
|-id=094 bgcolor=#E9E9E9
| 71094 ||  || — || December 12, 1999 || Socorro || LINEAR || — || align=right | 4.0 km || 
|-id=095 bgcolor=#E9E9E9
| 71095 ||  || — || December 12, 1999 || Socorro || LINEAR || EUN || align=right | 3.8 km || 
|-id=096 bgcolor=#E9E9E9
| 71096 ||  || — || December 13, 1999 || Fountain Hills || C. W. Juels || JUN || align=right | 5.4 km || 
|-id=097 bgcolor=#E9E9E9
| 71097 ||  || — || December 3, 1999 || Anderson Mesa || LONEOS || — || align=right | 5.5 km || 
|-id=098 bgcolor=#E9E9E9
| 71098 ||  || — || December 11, 1999 || Uccle || T. Pauwels || — || align=right | 13 km || 
|-id=099 bgcolor=#d6d6d6
| 71099 ||  || — || December 5, 1999 || Kitt Peak || Spacewatch || — || align=right | 5.7 km || 
|-id=100 bgcolor=#d6d6d6
| 71100 ||  || — || December 2, 1999 || Kitt Peak || Spacewatch || — || align=right | 5.3 km || 
|}

71101–71200 

|-bgcolor=#d6d6d6
| 71101 ||  || — || December 2, 1999 || Kitt Peak || Spacewatch || — || align=right | 4.1 km || 
|-id=102 bgcolor=#E9E9E9
| 71102 ||  || — || December 15, 1999 || Fountain Hills || C. W. Juels || — || align=right | 4.5 km || 
|-id=103 bgcolor=#E9E9E9
| 71103 ||  || — || December 11, 1999 || Oohira || T. Urata || — || align=right | 3.6 km || 
|-id=104 bgcolor=#E9E9E9
| 71104 ||  || — || December 7, 1999 || Kitt Peak || Spacewatch || — || align=right | 3.0 km || 
|-id=105 bgcolor=#E9E9E9
| 71105 ||  || — || December 7, 1999 || Kitt Peak || Spacewatch || VIB || align=right | 6.5 km || 
|-id=106 bgcolor=#d6d6d6
| 71106 ||  || — || December 7, 1999 || Kitt Peak || Spacewatch || HYG || align=right | 5.8 km || 
|-id=107 bgcolor=#d6d6d6
| 71107 ||  || — || December 7, 1999 || Kitt Peak || Spacewatch || EOS || align=right | 4.0 km || 
|-id=108 bgcolor=#d6d6d6
| 71108 ||  || — || December 7, 1999 || Socorro || LINEAR || EOS || align=right | 5.3 km || 
|-id=109 bgcolor=#E9E9E9
| 71109 ||  || — || December 7, 1999 || Socorro || LINEAR || GEF || align=right | 4.7 km || 
|-id=110 bgcolor=#E9E9E9
| 71110 ||  || — || December 8, 1999 || Socorro || LINEAR || JUN || align=right | 2.4 km || 
|-id=111 bgcolor=#d6d6d6
| 71111 ||  || — || December 8, 1999 || Socorro || LINEAR || EOS || align=right | 4.6 km || 
|-id=112 bgcolor=#E9E9E9
| 71112 ||  || — || December 8, 1999 || Socorro || LINEAR || — || align=right | 3.3 km || 
|-id=113 bgcolor=#E9E9E9
| 71113 ||  || — || December 8, 1999 || Socorro || LINEAR || PAD || align=right | 5.0 km || 
|-id=114 bgcolor=#E9E9E9
| 71114 ||  || — || December 8, 1999 || Socorro || LINEAR || HOF || align=right | 6.6 km || 
|-id=115 bgcolor=#d6d6d6
| 71115 ||  || — || December 8, 1999 || Socorro || LINEAR || EOS || align=right | 5.6 km || 
|-id=116 bgcolor=#d6d6d6
| 71116 ||  || — || December 8, 1999 || Socorro || LINEAR || HYG || align=right | 6.4 km || 
|-id=117 bgcolor=#E9E9E9
| 71117 ||  || — || December 8, 1999 || Socorro || LINEAR || EUN || align=right | 3.8 km || 
|-id=118 bgcolor=#E9E9E9
| 71118 ||  || — || December 8, 1999 || Socorro || LINEAR || — || align=right | 4.1 km || 
|-id=119 bgcolor=#E9E9E9
| 71119 ||  || — || December 12, 1999 || Socorro || LINEAR || EUN || align=right | 5.9 km || 
|-id=120 bgcolor=#E9E9E9
| 71120 ||  || — || December 13, 1999 || Socorro || LINEAR || — || align=right | 3.4 km || 
|-id=121 bgcolor=#E9E9E9
| 71121 ||  || — || December 8, 1999 || Socorro || LINEAR || — || align=right | 3.0 km || 
|-id=122 bgcolor=#E9E9E9
| 71122 ||  || — || December 8, 1999 || Socorro || LINEAR || DOR || align=right | 7.1 km || 
|-id=123 bgcolor=#E9E9E9
| 71123 ||  || — || December 10, 1999 || Socorro || LINEAR || MAR || align=right | 2.6 km || 
|-id=124 bgcolor=#E9E9E9
| 71124 ||  || — || December 10, 1999 || Socorro || LINEAR || EUN || align=right | 4.7 km || 
|-id=125 bgcolor=#E9E9E9
| 71125 ||  || — || December 10, 1999 || Socorro || LINEAR || — || align=right | 6.6 km || 
|-id=126 bgcolor=#E9E9E9
| 71126 ||  || — || December 10, 1999 || Socorro || LINEAR || EUN || align=right | 3.9 km || 
|-id=127 bgcolor=#E9E9E9
| 71127 ||  || — || December 10, 1999 || Socorro || LINEAR || GEF || align=right | 5.0 km || 
|-id=128 bgcolor=#d6d6d6
| 71128 ||  || — || December 10, 1999 || Socorro || LINEAR || — || align=right | 9.6 km || 
|-id=129 bgcolor=#E9E9E9
| 71129 ||  || — || December 10, 1999 || Socorro || LINEAR || — || align=right | 3.5 km || 
|-id=130 bgcolor=#d6d6d6
| 71130 ||  || — || December 10, 1999 || Socorro || LINEAR || PAL || align=right | 6.0 km || 
|-id=131 bgcolor=#E9E9E9
| 71131 ||  || — || December 10, 1999 || Socorro || LINEAR || — || align=right | 4.3 km || 
|-id=132 bgcolor=#E9E9E9
| 71132 ||  || — || December 10, 1999 || Socorro || LINEAR || — || align=right | 7.2 km || 
|-id=133 bgcolor=#E9E9E9
| 71133 ||  || — || December 10, 1999 || Socorro || LINEAR || — || align=right | 5.5 km || 
|-id=134 bgcolor=#d6d6d6
| 71134 ||  || — || December 10, 1999 || Socorro || LINEAR || — || align=right | 4.7 km || 
|-id=135 bgcolor=#d6d6d6
| 71135 ||  || — || December 10, 1999 || Socorro || LINEAR || — || align=right | 13 km || 
|-id=136 bgcolor=#d6d6d6
| 71136 ||  || — || December 10, 1999 || Socorro || LINEAR || — || align=right | 9.4 km || 
|-id=137 bgcolor=#d6d6d6
| 71137 ||  || — || December 10, 1999 || Socorro || LINEAR || — || align=right | 7.7 km || 
|-id=138 bgcolor=#E9E9E9
| 71138 ||  || — || December 10, 1999 || Socorro || LINEAR || MRX || align=right | 2.5 km || 
|-id=139 bgcolor=#d6d6d6
| 71139 ||  || — || December 10, 1999 || Socorro || LINEAR || — || align=right | 5.8 km || 
|-id=140 bgcolor=#E9E9E9
| 71140 ||  || — || December 10, 1999 || Socorro || LINEAR || — || align=right | 7.8 km || 
|-id=141 bgcolor=#E9E9E9
| 71141 ||  || — || December 12, 1999 || Socorro || LINEAR || EUN || align=right | 3.3 km || 
|-id=142 bgcolor=#E9E9E9
| 71142 ||  || — || December 12, 1999 || Socorro || LINEAR || EUN || align=right | 4.0 km || 
|-id=143 bgcolor=#E9E9E9
| 71143 ||  || — || December 12, 1999 || Socorro || LINEAR || — || align=right | 5.0 km || 
|-id=144 bgcolor=#E9E9E9
| 71144 ||  || — || December 12, 1999 || Socorro || LINEAR || — || align=right | 3.7 km || 
|-id=145 bgcolor=#E9E9E9
| 71145 ||  || — || December 12, 1999 || Socorro || LINEAR || MAR || align=right | 6.1 km || 
|-id=146 bgcolor=#E9E9E9
| 71146 ||  || — || December 12, 1999 || Socorro || LINEAR || GEF || align=right | 3.2 km || 
|-id=147 bgcolor=#E9E9E9
| 71147 ||  || — || December 12, 1999 || Socorro || LINEAR || — || align=right | 3.9 km || 
|-id=148 bgcolor=#E9E9E9
| 71148 ||  || — || December 12, 1999 || Socorro || LINEAR || EUN || align=right | 3.6 km || 
|-id=149 bgcolor=#E9E9E9
| 71149 ||  || — || December 12, 1999 || Socorro || LINEAR || EUN || align=right | 5.3 km || 
|-id=150 bgcolor=#E9E9E9
| 71150 ||  || — || December 12, 1999 || Socorro || LINEAR || — || align=right | 3.6 km || 
|-id=151 bgcolor=#E9E9E9
| 71151 ||  || — || December 12, 1999 || Socorro || LINEAR || GEF || align=right | 2.7 km || 
|-id=152 bgcolor=#E9E9E9
| 71152 ||  || — || December 12, 1999 || Socorro || LINEAR || — || align=right | 3.5 km || 
|-id=153 bgcolor=#E9E9E9
| 71153 ||  || — || December 12, 1999 || Socorro || LINEAR || — || align=right | 6.4 km || 
|-id=154 bgcolor=#E9E9E9
| 71154 ||  || — || December 12, 1999 || Socorro || LINEAR || — || align=right | 8.3 km || 
|-id=155 bgcolor=#E9E9E9
| 71155 ||  || — || December 12, 1999 || Socorro || LINEAR || — || align=right | 4.7 km || 
|-id=156 bgcolor=#E9E9E9
| 71156 ||  || — || December 12, 1999 || Socorro || LINEAR || — || align=right | 5.1 km || 
|-id=157 bgcolor=#d6d6d6
| 71157 ||  || — || December 12, 1999 || Socorro || LINEAR || EOS || align=right | 5.5 km || 
|-id=158 bgcolor=#d6d6d6
| 71158 ||  || — || December 12, 1999 || Socorro || LINEAR || — || align=right | 6.5 km || 
|-id=159 bgcolor=#d6d6d6
| 71159 ||  || — || December 12, 1999 || Socorro || LINEAR || EOS || align=right | 5.7 km || 
|-id=160 bgcolor=#E9E9E9
| 71160 ||  || — || December 12, 1999 || Socorro || LINEAR || MAR || align=right | 4.3 km || 
|-id=161 bgcolor=#E9E9E9
| 71161 ||  || — || December 12, 1999 || Socorro || LINEAR || GEF || align=right | 5.4 km || 
|-id=162 bgcolor=#d6d6d6
| 71162 ||  || — || December 12, 1999 || Socorro || LINEAR || — || align=right | 6.0 km || 
|-id=163 bgcolor=#E9E9E9
| 71163 ||  || — || December 12, 1999 || Socorro || LINEAR || — || align=right | 6.3 km || 
|-id=164 bgcolor=#d6d6d6
| 71164 ||  || — || December 12, 1999 || Socorro || LINEAR || — || align=right | 5.3 km || 
|-id=165 bgcolor=#d6d6d6
| 71165 ||  || — || December 12, 1999 || Socorro || LINEAR || — || align=right | 4.9 km || 
|-id=166 bgcolor=#d6d6d6
| 71166 ||  || — || December 12, 1999 || Socorro || LINEAR || URS || align=right | 11 km || 
|-id=167 bgcolor=#E9E9E9
| 71167 ||  || — || December 12, 1999 || Socorro || LINEAR || — || align=right | 4.7 km || 
|-id=168 bgcolor=#E9E9E9
| 71168 ||  || — || December 12, 1999 || Socorro || LINEAR || INO || align=right | 3.6 km || 
|-id=169 bgcolor=#E9E9E9
| 71169 ||  || — || December 12, 1999 || Socorro || LINEAR || — || align=right | 4.1 km || 
|-id=170 bgcolor=#d6d6d6
| 71170 ||  || — || December 12, 1999 || Socorro || LINEAR || EOS || align=right | 5.2 km || 
|-id=171 bgcolor=#d6d6d6
| 71171 ||  || — || December 12, 1999 || Socorro || LINEAR || — || align=right | 5.2 km || 
|-id=172 bgcolor=#d6d6d6
| 71172 ||  || — || December 12, 1999 || Socorro || LINEAR || CRO || align=right | 8.6 km || 
|-id=173 bgcolor=#E9E9E9
| 71173 ||  || — || December 13, 1999 || Socorro || LINEAR || — || align=right | 5.2 km || 
|-id=174 bgcolor=#d6d6d6
| 71174 ||  || — || December 13, 1999 || Socorro || LINEAR || — || align=right | 5.6 km || 
|-id=175 bgcolor=#E9E9E9
| 71175 ||  || — || December 14, 1999 || Socorro || LINEAR || — || align=right | 2.6 km || 
|-id=176 bgcolor=#E9E9E9
| 71176 ||  || — || December 14, 1999 || Socorro || LINEAR || — || align=right | 3.6 km || 
|-id=177 bgcolor=#E9E9E9
| 71177 ||  || — || December 14, 1999 || Socorro || LINEAR || — || align=right | 5.0 km || 
|-id=178 bgcolor=#E9E9E9
| 71178 ||  || — || December 14, 1999 || Socorro || LINEAR || RAF || align=right | 3.0 km || 
|-id=179 bgcolor=#E9E9E9
| 71179 ||  || — || December 14, 1999 || Socorro || LINEAR || — || align=right | 4.6 km || 
|-id=180 bgcolor=#d6d6d6
| 71180 ||  || — || December 14, 1999 || Socorro || LINEAR || EOS || align=right | 6.4 km || 
|-id=181 bgcolor=#d6d6d6
| 71181 ||  || — || December 14, 1999 || Socorro || LINEAR || — || align=right | 5.3 km || 
|-id=182 bgcolor=#E9E9E9
| 71182 ||  || — || December 14, 1999 || Socorro || LINEAR || HOF || align=right | 5.6 km || 
|-id=183 bgcolor=#E9E9E9
| 71183 ||  || — || December 14, 1999 || Socorro || LINEAR || — || align=right | 2.6 km || 
|-id=184 bgcolor=#E9E9E9
| 71184 ||  || — || December 13, 1999 || Kitt Peak || Spacewatch || — || align=right | 3.7 km || 
|-id=185 bgcolor=#E9E9E9
| 71185 ||  || — || December 14, 1999 || Socorro || LINEAR || — || align=right | 3.2 km || 
|-id=186 bgcolor=#d6d6d6
| 71186 ||  || — || December 15, 1999 || Socorro || LINEAR || — || align=right | 7.4 km || 
|-id=187 bgcolor=#E9E9E9
| 71187 ||  || — || December 13, 1999 || Kitt Peak || Spacewatch || — || align=right | 5.2 km || 
|-id=188 bgcolor=#d6d6d6
| 71188 ||  || — || December 13, 1999 || Kitt Peak || Spacewatch || TRP || align=right | 7.0 km || 
|-id=189 bgcolor=#E9E9E9
| 71189 ||  || — || December 7, 1999 || Catalina || CSS || ADE || align=right | 5.8 km || 
|-id=190 bgcolor=#E9E9E9
| 71190 ||  || — || December 7, 1999 || Catalina || CSS || GEF || align=right | 3.2 km || 
|-id=191 bgcolor=#E9E9E9
| 71191 ||  || — || December 7, 1999 || Catalina || CSS || — || align=right | 6.9 km || 
|-id=192 bgcolor=#E9E9E9
| 71192 ||  || — || December 7, 1999 || Catalina || CSS || — || align=right | 5.8 km || 
|-id=193 bgcolor=#d6d6d6
| 71193 ||  || — || December 7, 1999 || Catalina || CSS || — || align=right | 15 km || 
|-id=194 bgcolor=#d6d6d6
| 71194 ||  || — || December 7, 1999 || Catalina || CSS || — || align=right | 12 km || 
|-id=195 bgcolor=#d6d6d6
| 71195 ||  || — || December 8, 1999 || Catalina || CSS || — || align=right | 7.3 km || 
|-id=196 bgcolor=#fefefe
| 71196 ||  || — || December 4, 1999 || Anderson Mesa || LONEOS || — || align=right | 6.1 km || 
|-id=197 bgcolor=#E9E9E9
| 71197 ||  || — || December 4, 1999 || Anderson Mesa || LONEOS || — || align=right | 5.1 km || 
|-id=198 bgcolor=#E9E9E9
| 71198 ||  || — || December 3, 1999 || Anderson Mesa || LONEOS || — || align=right | 2.1 km || 
|-id=199 bgcolor=#E9E9E9
| 71199 ||  || — || December 5, 1999 || Anderson Mesa || LONEOS || EUN || align=right | 6.5 km || 
|-id=200 bgcolor=#E9E9E9
| 71200 ||  || — || December 5, 1999 || Catalina || CSS || — || align=right | 6.6 km || 
|}

71201–71300 

|-bgcolor=#E9E9E9
| 71201 ||  || — || December 7, 1999 || Catalina || CSS || — || align=right | 4.6 km || 
|-id=202 bgcolor=#E9E9E9
| 71202 ||  || — || December 12, 1999 || Catalina || CSS || — || align=right | 4.3 km || 
|-id=203 bgcolor=#E9E9E9
| 71203 ||  || — || December 12, 1999 || Socorro || LINEAR || — || align=right | 4.3 km || 
|-id=204 bgcolor=#E9E9E9
| 71204 ||  || — || December 13, 1999 || Socorro || LINEAR || — || align=right | 4.8 km || 
|-id=205 bgcolor=#E9E9E9
| 71205 ||  || — || December 6, 1999 || Socorro || LINEAR || — || align=right | 3.7 km || 
|-id=206 bgcolor=#E9E9E9
| 71206 ||  || — || December 3, 1999 || Socorro || LINEAR || — || align=right | 4.0 km || 
|-id=207 bgcolor=#E9E9E9
| 71207 ||  || — || December 5, 1999 || Socorro || LINEAR || — || align=right | 3.0 km || 
|-id=208 bgcolor=#E9E9E9
| 71208 ||  || — || December 6, 1999 || Socorro || LINEAR || EUN || align=right | 3.3 km || 
|-id=209 bgcolor=#E9E9E9
| 71209 ||  || — || December 6, 1999 || Socorro || LINEAR || MAR || align=right | 3.2 km || 
|-id=210 bgcolor=#E9E9E9
| 71210 ||  || — || December 6, 1999 || Socorro || LINEAR || WIT || align=right | 2.4 km || 
|-id=211 bgcolor=#E9E9E9
| 71211 ||  || — || December 7, 1999 || Socorro || LINEAR || — || align=right | 4.3 km || 
|-id=212 bgcolor=#E9E9E9
| 71212 ||  || — || December 7, 1999 || Catalina || CSS || — || align=right | 5.4 km || 
|-id=213 bgcolor=#E9E9E9
| 71213 ||  || — || December 7, 1999 || Socorro || LINEAR || — || align=right | 2.4 km || 
|-id=214 bgcolor=#d6d6d6
| 71214 ||  || — || December 3, 1999 || Anderson Mesa || LONEOS || — || align=right | 8.3 km || 
|-id=215 bgcolor=#E9E9E9
| 71215 ||  || — || December 3, 1999 || Socorro || LINEAR || BRU || align=right | 11 km || 
|-id=216 bgcolor=#E9E9E9
| 71216 ||  || — || December 16, 1999 || Socorro || LINEAR || JUN || align=right | 2.1 km || 
|-id=217 bgcolor=#E9E9E9
| 71217 ||  || — || December 16, 1999 || Socorro || LINEAR || — || align=right | 3.8 km || 
|-id=218 bgcolor=#d6d6d6
| 71218 ||  || — || December 27, 1999 || Oizumi || T. Kobayashi || URS || align=right | 8.2 km || 
|-id=219 bgcolor=#E9E9E9
| 71219 ||  || — || December 30, 1999 || Socorro || LINEAR || MAR || align=right | 3.7 km || 
|-id=220 bgcolor=#E9E9E9
| 71220 ||  || — || December 31, 1999 || Prescott || P. G. Comba || — || align=right | 2.0 km || 
|-id=221 bgcolor=#E9E9E9
| 71221 ||  || — || December 31, 1999 || San Marcello || M. Tombelli, L. Tesi || DOR || align=right | 5.2 km || 
|-id=222 bgcolor=#d6d6d6
| 71222 ||  || — || December 31, 1999 || Oizumi || T. Kobayashi || — || align=right | 4.9 km || 
|-id=223 bgcolor=#E9E9E9
| 71223 ||  || — || December 27, 1999 || Kitt Peak || Spacewatch || — || align=right | 3.5 km || 
|-id=224 bgcolor=#E9E9E9
| 71224 ||  || — || December 31, 1999 || Kitt Peak || Spacewatch || EUN || align=right | 2.6 km || 
|-id=225 bgcolor=#d6d6d6
| 71225 ||  || — || December 31, 1999 || Višnjan Observatory || K. Korlević || — || align=right | 11 km || 
|-id=226 bgcolor=#d6d6d6
| 71226 ||  || — || December 31, 1999 || Kitt Peak || Spacewatch || — || align=right | 5.7 km || 
|-id=227 bgcolor=#E9E9E9
| 71227 ||  || — || December 31, 1999 || Kitt Peak || Spacewatch || — || align=right | 3.0 km || 
|-id=228 bgcolor=#d6d6d6
| 71228 ||  || — || December 31, 1999 || Kitt Peak || Spacewatch || — || align=right | 4.8 km || 
|-id=229 bgcolor=#d6d6d6
| 71229 ||  || — || December 31, 1999 || Kitt Peak || Spacewatch || HYG || align=right | 5.5 km || 
|-id=230 bgcolor=#d6d6d6
| 71230 ||  || — || December 17, 1999 || Xinglong || SCAP || TIR || align=right | 11 km || 
|-id=231 bgcolor=#E9E9E9
| 71231 ||  || — || December 31, 1999 || Kitt Peak || Spacewatch || GEF || align=right | 2.3 km || 
|-id=232 bgcolor=#E9E9E9
| 71232 ||  || — || December 30, 1999 || Socorro || LINEAR || EUN || align=right | 4.1 km || 
|-id=233 bgcolor=#E9E9E9
| 71233 || 2000 AC || — || January 1, 2000 || Višnjan Observatory || K. Korlević || — || align=right | 5.4 km || 
|-id=234 bgcolor=#E9E9E9
| 71234 ||  || — || January 3, 2000 || Oizumi || T. Kobayashi || — || align=right | 3.9 km || 
|-id=235 bgcolor=#d6d6d6
| 71235 ||  || — || January 4, 2000 || Prescott || P. G. Comba || — || align=right | 6.8 km || 
|-id=236 bgcolor=#d6d6d6
| 71236 ||  || — || January 3, 2000 || Chiyoda || T. Kojima || — || align=right | 7.1 km || 
|-id=237 bgcolor=#E9E9E9
| 71237 ||  || — || January 2, 2000 || Socorro || LINEAR || PAD || align=right | 7.1 km || 
|-id=238 bgcolor=#E9E9E9
| 71238 ||  || — || January 2, 2000 || Socorro || LINEAR || — || align=right | 2.7 km || 
|-id=239 bgcolor=#E9E9E9
| 71239 ||  || — || January 2, 2000 || Socorro || LINEAR || GEF || align=right | 4.5 km || 
|-id=240 bgcolor=#E9E9E9
| 71240 ||  || — || January 2, 2000 || Socorro || LINEAR || MAR || align=right | 3.1 km || 
|-id=241 bgcolor=#E9E9E9
| 71241 ||  || — || January 2, 2000 || Socorro || LINEAR || RAF || align=right | 2.3 km || 
|-id=242 bgcolor=#E9E9E9
| 71242 ||  || — || January 2, 2000 || Socorro || LINEAR || — || align=right | 2.4 km || 
|-id=243 bgcolor=#E9E9E9
| 71243 ||  || — || January 2, 2000 || Socorro || LINEAR || — || align=right | 6.4 km || 
|-id=244 bgcolor=#E9E9E9
| 71244 ||  || — || January 2, 2000 || Socorro || LINEAR || — || align=right | 4.0 km || 
|-id=245 bgcolor=#E9E9E9
| 71245 ||  || — || January 3, 2000 || Socorro || LINEAR || — || align=right | 3.0 km || 
|-id=246 bgcolor=#E9E9E9
| 71246 ||  || — || January 3, 2000 || Socorro || LINEAR || — || align=right | 3.6 km || 
|-id=247 bgcolor=#E9E9E9
| 71247 ||  || — || January 3, 2000 || Socorro || LINEAR || VIB || align=right | 5.2 km || 
|-id=248 bgcolor=#E9E9E9
| 71248 ||  || — || January 3, 2000 || Socorro || LINEAR || — || align=right | 3.4 km || 
|-id=249 bgcolor=#E9E9E9
| 71249 ||  || — || January 3, 2000 || Socorro || LINEAR || EUN || align=right | 3.8 km || 
|-id=250 bgcolor=#E9E9E9
| 71250 ||  || — || January 3, 2000 || Socorro || LINEAR || — || align=right | 2.6 km || 
|-id=251 bgcolor=#E9E9E9
| 71251 ||  || — || January 3, 2000 || Socorro || LINEAR || PAD || align=right | 6.1 km || 
|-id=252 bgcolor=#d6d6d6
| 71252 ||  || — || January 3, 2000 || Socorro || LINEAR || EOS || align=right | 4.5 km || 
|-id=253 bgcolor=#E9E9E9
| 71253 ||  || — || January 3, 2000 || Socorro || LINEAR || — || align=right | 3.3 km || 
|-id=254 bgcolor=#E9E9E9
| 71254 ||  || — || January 3, 2000 || Socorro || LINEAR || — || align=right | 5.2 km || 
|-id=255 bgcolor=#E9E9E9
| 71255 ||  || — || January 3, 2000 || Socorro || LINEAR || — || align=right | 3.4 km || 
|-id=256 bgcolor=#d6d6d6
| 71256 ||  || — || January 3, 2000 || Socorro || LINEAR || — || align=right | 8.8 km || 
|-id=257 bgcolor=#E9E9E9
| 71257 ||  || — || January 3, 2000 || Socorro || LINEAR || — || align=right | 5.5 km || 
|-id=258 bgcolor=#E9E9E9
| 71258 ||  || — || January 3, 2000 || Socorro || LINEAR || — || align=right | 4.8 km || 
|-id=259 bgcolor=#d6d6d6
| 71259 ||  || — || January 3, 2000 || Socorro || LINEAR || — || align=right | 5.5 km || 
|-id=260 bgcolor=#E9E9E9
| 71260 ||  || — || January 3, 2000 || Socorro || LINEAR || MRX || align=right | 2.8 km || 
|-id=261 bgcolor=#E9E9E9
| 71261 ||  || — || January 3, 2000 || Socorro || LINEAR || — || align=right | 6.0 km || 
|-id=262 bgcolor=#E9E9E9
| 71262 ||  || — || January 3, 2000 || Socorro || LINEAR || HOF || align=right | 6.5 km || 
|-id=263 bgcolor=#d6d6d6
| 71263 ||  || — || January 3, 2000 || Socorro || LINEAR || — || align=right | 7.3 km || 
|-id=264 bgcolor=#d6d6d6
| 71264 ||  || — || January 3, 2000 || Socorro || LINEAR || — || align=right | 5.1 km || 
|-id=265 bgcolor=#E9E9E9
| 71265 ||  || — || January 3, 2000 || Socorro || LINEAR || — || align=right | 5.1 km || 
|-id=266 bgcolor=#d6d6d6
| 71266 ||  || — || January 3, 2000 || Socorro || LINEAR || KOR || align=right | 3.3 km || 
|-id=267 bgcolor=#d6d6d6
| 71267 ||  || — || January 3, 2000 || Socorro || LINEAR || — || align=right | 7.2 km || 
|-id=268 bgcolor=#d6d6d6
| 71268 ||  || — || January 3, 2000 || Socorro || LINEAR || KOR || align=right | 3.4 km || 
|-id=269 bgcolor=#E9E9E9
| 71269 ||  || — || January 3, 2000 || Socorro || LINEAR || — || align=right | 4.7 km || 
|-id=270 bgcolor=#E9E9E9
| 71270 ||  || — || January 3, 2000 || Socorro || LINEAR || GEF || align=right | 3.2 km || 
|-id=271 bgcolor=#d6d6d6
| 71271 ||  || — || January 3, 2000 || Socorro || LINEAR || — || align=right | 9.9 km || 
|-id=272 bgcolor=#d6d6d6
| 71272 ||  || — || January 3, 2000 || Socorro || LINEAR || — || align=right | 6.8 km || 
|-id=273 bgcolor=#d6d6d6
| 71273 ||  || — || January 3, 2000 || Socorro || LINEAR || EOS || align=right | 5.6 km || 
|-id=274 bgcolor=#d6d6d6
| 71274 ||  || — || January 3, 2000 || Socorro || LINEAR || EOS || align=right | 6.9 km || 
|-id=275 bgcolor=#d6d6d6
| 71275 ||  || — || January 3, 2000 || Socorro || LINEAR || — || align=right | 3.8 km || 
|-id=276 bgcolor=#d6d6d6
| 71276 ||  || — || January 3, 2000 || Socorro || LINEAR || — || align=right | 3.9 km || 
|-id=277 bgcolor=#E9E9E9
| 71277 ||  || — || January 5, 2000 || Kitt Peak || Spacewatch || — || align=right | 2.0 km || 
|-id=278 bgcolor=#E9E9E9
| 71278 ||  || — || January 3, 2000 || Socorro || LINEAR || — || align=right | 7.3 km || 
|-id=279 bgcolor=#E9E9E9
| 71279 ||  || — || January 3, 2000 || Socorro || LINEAR || HOF || align=right | 6.8 km || 
|-id=280 bgcolor=#d6d6d6
| 71280 ||  || — || January 4, 2000 || Socorro || LINEAR || EOS || align=right | 5.6 km || 
|-id=281 bgcolor=#E9E9E9
| 71281 ||  || — || January 4, 2000 || Socorro || LINEAR || GEF || align=right | 2.8 km || 
|-id=282 bgcolor=#d6d6d6
| 71282 Holuby ||  ||  || January 6, 2000 || Modra || A. Galád, P. Kolény || — || align=right | 6.4 km || 
|-id=283 bgcolor=#d6d6d6
| 71283 ||  || — || January 4, 2000 || Višnjan Observatory || K. Korlević || EOS || align=right | 3.7 km || 
|-id=284 bgcolor=#d6d6d6
| 71284 ||  || — || January 5, 2000 || Višnjan Observatory || K. Korlević || THM || align=right | 5.4 km || 
|-id=285 bgcolor=#E9E9E9
| 71285 ||  || — || January 3, 2000 || Socorro || LINEAR || — || align=right | 4.0 km || 
|-id=286 bgcolor=#fefefe
| 71286 ||  || — || January 4, 2000 || Socorro || LINEAR || V || align=right | 2.1 km || 
|-id=287 bgcolor=#E9E9E9
| 71287 ||  || — || January 4, 2000 || Socorro || LINEAR || — || align=right | 3.1 km || 
|-id=288 bgcolor=#E9E9E9
| 71288 ||  || — || January 4, 2000 || Socorro || LINEAR || EUN || align=right | 2.8 km || 
|-id=289 bgcolor=#d6d6d6
| 71289 ||  || — || January 4, 2000 || Socorro || LINEAR || — || align=right | 5.6 km || 
|-id=290 bgcolor=#E9E9E9
| 71290 ||  || — || January 4, 2000 || Socorro || LINEAR || MRX || align=right | 2.8 km || 
|-id=291 bgcolor=#d6d6d6
| 71291 ||  || — || January 4, 2000 || Socorro || LINEAR || — || align=right | 2.8 km || 
|-id=292 bgcolor=#E9E9E9
| 71292 ||  || — || January 4, 2000 || Socorro || LINEAR || — || align=right | 3.4 km || 
|-id=293 bgcolor=#E9E9E9
| 71293 ||  || — || January 4, 2000 || Socorro || LINEAR || — || align=right | 4.5 km || 
|-id=294 bgcolor=#E9E9E9
| 71294 ||  || — || January 4, 2000 || Socorro || LINEAR || EUN || align=right | 2.8 km || 
|-id=295 bgcolor=#d6d6d6
| 71295 ||  || — || January 4, 2000 || Socorro || LINEAR || — || align=right | 3.9 km || 
|-id=296 bgcolor=#E9E9E9
| 71296 ||  || — || January 4, 2000 || Socorro || LINEAR || MRX || align=right | 2.4 km || 
|-id=297 bgcolor=#E9E9E9
| 71297 ||  || — || January 4, 2000 || Socorro || LINEAR || EUN || align=right | 3.9 km || 
|-id=298 bgcolor=#d6d6d6
| 71298 ||  || — || January 4, 2000 || Socorro || LINEAR || — || align=right | 9.7 km || 
|-id=299 bgcolor=#d6d6d6
| 71299 ||  || — || January 4, 2000 || Socorro || LINEAR || — || align=right | 5.5 km || 
|-id=300 bgcolor=#E9E9E9
| 71300 ||  || — || January 4, 2000 || Socorro || LINEAR || EUN || align=right | 4.1 km || 
|}

71301–71400 

|-bgcolor=#d6d6d6
| 71301 ||  || — || January 4, 2000 || Socorro || LINEAR || — || align=right | 3.9 km || 
|-id=302 bgcolor=#d6d6d6
| 71302 ||  || — || January 4, 2000 || Socorro || LINEAR || EOS || align=right | 5.4 km || 
|-id=303 bgcolor=#d6d6d6
| 71303 ||  || — || January 4, 2000 || Socorro || LINEAR || — || align=right | 3.7 km || 
|-id=304 bgcolor=#E9E9E9
| 71304 ||  || — || January 4, 2000 || Socorro || LINEAR || — || align=right | 8.5 km || 
|-id=305 bgcolor=#E9E9E9
| 71305 ||  || — || January 5, 2000 || Socorro || LINEAR || — || align=right | 3.5 km || 
|-id=306 bgcolor=#E9E9E9
| 71306 ||  || — || January 5, 2000 || Socorro || LINEAR || EUN || align=right | 4.2 km || 
|-id=307 bgcolor=#E9E9E9
| 71307 ||  || — || January 5, 2000 || Socorro || LINEAR || NEM || align=right | 3.9 km || 
|-id=308 bgcolor=#E9E9E9
| 71308 ||  || — || January 5, 2000 || Socorro || LINEAR || — || align=right | 5.3 km || 
|-id=309 bgcolor=#E9E9E9
| 71309 ||  || — || January 5, 2000 || Socorro || LINEAR || MAR || align=right | 3.6 km || 
|-id=310 bgcolor=#E9E9E9
| 71310 ||  || — || January 5, 2000 || Socorro || LINEAR || — || align=right | 2.6 km || 
|-id=311 bgcolor=#E9E9E9
| 71311 ||  || — || January 5, 2000 || Socorro || LINEAR || — || align=right | 2.8 km || 
|-id=312 bgcolor=#E9E9E9
| 71312 ||  || — || January 5, 2000 || Socorro || LINEAR || EUN || align=right | 3.6 km || 
|-id=313 bgcolor=#d6d6d6
| 71313 ||  || — || January 5, 2000 || Socorro || LINEAR || — || align=right | 6.5 km || 
|-id=314 bgcolor=#d6d6d6
| 71314 ||  || — || January 5, 2000 || Socorro || LINEAR || KOR || align=right | 3.5 km || 
|-id=315 bgcolor=#E9E9E9
| 71315 ||  || — || January 5, 2000 || Socorro || LINEAR || — || align=right | 3.1 km || 
|-id=316 bgcolor=#fefefe
| 71316 ||  || — || January 5, 2000 || Socorro || LINEAR || — || align=right | 2.4 km || 
|-id=317 bgcolor=#E9E9E9
| 71317 ||  || — || January 5, 2000 || Socorro || LINEAR || — || align=right | 3.9 km || 
|-id=318 bgcolor=#E9E9E9
| 71318 ||  || — || January 5, 2000 || Socorro || LINEAR || — || align=right | 3.5 km || 
|-id=319 bgcolor=#d6d6d6
| 71319 ||  || — || January 5, 2000 || Socorro || LINEAR || — || align=right | 5.4 km || 
|-id=320 bgcolor=#d6d6d6
| 71320 ||  || — || January 5, 2000 || Socorro || LINEAR || — || align=right | 8.6 km || 
|-id=321 bgcolor=#d6d6d6
| 71321 ||  || — || January 5, 2000 || Socorro || LINEAR || HYG || align=right | 6.6 km || 
|-id=322 bgcolor=#d6d6d6
| 71322 ||  || — || January 5, 2000 || Socorro || LINEAR || KOR || align=right | 4.1 km || 
|-id=323 bgcolor=#E9E9E9
| 71323 ||  || — || January 5, 2000 || Socorro || LINEAR || HOF || align=right | 6.5 km || 
|-id=324 bgcolor=#d6d6d6
| 71324 ||  || — || January 5, 2000 || Socorro || LINEAR || — || align=right | 8.7 km || 
|-id=325 bgcolor=#E9E9E9
| 71325 ||  || — || January 5, 2000 || Socorro || LINEAR || — || align=right | 5.5 km || 
|-id=326 bgcolor=#d6d6d6
| 71326 ||  || — || January 5, 2000 || Socorro || LINEAR || EOS || align=right | 6.3 km || 
|-id=327 bgcolor=#d6d6d6
| 71327 ||  || — || January 5, 2000 || Socorro || LINEAR || THM || align=right | 6.4 km || 
|-id=328 bgcolor=#E9E9E9
| 71328 ||  || — || January 5, 2000 || Socorro || LINEAR || DOR || align=right | 7.9 km || 
|-id=329 bgcolor=#d6d6d6
| 71329 ||  || — || January 5, 2000 || Socorro || LINEAR || — || align=right | 8.7 km || 
|-id=330 bgcolor=#d6d6d6
| 71330 ||  || — || January 5, 2000 || Socorro || LINEAR || — || align=right | 9.4 km || 
|-id=331 bgcolor=#d6d6d6
| 71331 ||  || — || January 5, 2000 || Socorro || LINEAR || — || align=right | 3.8 km || 
|-id=332 bgcolor=#d6d6d6
| 71332 ||  || — || January 5, 2000 || Socorro || LINEAR || EOS || align=right | 4.3 km || 
|-id=333 bgcolor=#d6d6d6
| 71333 ||  || — || January 5, 2000 || Socorro || LINEAR || — || align=right | 10 km || 
|-id=334 bgcolor=#d6d6d6
| 71334 ||  || — || January 4, 2000 || Socorro || LINEAR || EOS || align=right | 5.3 km || 
|-id=335 bgcolor=#d6d6d6
| 71335 ||  || — || January 4, 2000 || Socorro || LINEAR || — || align=right | 5.4 km || 
|-id=336 bgcolor=#E9E9E9
| 71336 ||  || — || January 5, 2000 || Socorro || LINEAR || — || align=right | 4.4 km || 
|-id=337 bgcolor=#fefefe
| 71337 ||  || — || January 5, 2000 || Socorro || LINEAR || NYS || align=right | 2.8 km || 
|-id=338 bgcolor=#E9E9E9
| 71338 ||  || — || January 5, 2000 || Socorro || LINEAR || EUN || align=right | 2.9 km || 
|-id=339 bgcolor=#fefefe
| 71339 ||  || — || January 5, 2000 || Socorro || LINEAR || — || align=right | 3.9 km || 
|-id=340 bgcolor=#fefefe
| 71340 ||  || — || January 5, 2000 || Socorro || LINEAR || — || align=right | 3.1 km || 
|-id=341 bgcolor=#fefefe
| 71341 ||  || — || January 5, 2000 || Socorro || LINEAR || V || align=right | 2.9 km || 
|-id=342 bgcolor=#E9E9E9
| 71342 ||  || — || January 5, 2000 || Socorro || LINEAR || — || align=right | 5.6 km || 
|-id=343 bgcolor=#E9E9E9
| 71343 ||  || — || January 5, 2000 || Socorro || LINEAR || DOR || align=right | 8.6 km || 
|-id=344 bgcolor=#E9E9E9
| 71344 ||  || — || January 5, 2000 || Socorro || LINEAR || — || align=right | 3.3 km || 
|-id=345 bgcolor=#E9E9E9
| 71345 ||  || — || January 5, 2000 || Socorro || LINEAR || — || align=right | 4.8 km || 
|-id=346 bgcolor=#E9E9E9
| 71346 ||  || — || January 5, 2000 || Socorro || LINEAR || WAT || align=right | 5.2 km || 
|-id=347 bgcolor=#E9E9E9
| 71347 ||  || — || January 5, 2000 || Socorro || LINEAR || — || align=right | 4.8 km || 
|-id=348 bgcolor=#d6d6d6
| 71348 ||  || — || January 5, 2000 || Socorro || LINEAR || — || align=right | 5.0 km || 
|-id=349 bgcolor=#d6d6d6
| 71349 ||  || — || January 5, 2000 || Socorro || LINEAR || — || align=right | 5.2 km || 
|-id=350 bgcolor=#d6d6d6
| 71350 ||  || — || January 5, 2000 || Socorro || LINEAR || KOR || align=right | 3.4 km || 
|-id=351 bgcolor=#E9E9E9
| 71351 ||  || — || January 5, 2000 || Socorro || LINEAR || — || align=right | 3.3 km || 
|-id=352 bgcolor=#d6d6d6
| 71352 ||  || — || January 5, 2000 || Socorro || LINEAR || — || align=right | 8.4 km || 
|-id=353 bgcolor=#E9E9E9
| 71353 ||  || — || January 5, 2000 || Socorro || LINEAR || MAR || align=right | 3.4 km || 
|-id=354 bgcolor=#E9E9E9
| 71354 ||  || — || January 5, 2000 || Socorro || LINEAR || — || align=right | 5.5 km || 
|-id=355 bgcolor=#E9E9E9
| 71355 ||  || — || January 5, 2000 || Socorro || LINEAR || — || align=right | 6.0 km || 
|-id=356 bgcolor=#d6d6d6
| 71356 ||  || — || January 5, 2000 || Socorro || LINEAR || EOS || align=right | 4.3 km || 
|-id=357 bgcolor=#d6d6d6
| 71357 ||  || — || January 5, 2000 || Socorro || LINEAR || — || align=right | 6.7 km || 
|-id=358 bgcolor=#E9E9E9
| 71358 ||  || — || January 5, 2000 || Socorro || LINEAR || GEF || align=right | 3.5 km || 
|-id=359 bgcolor=#d6d6d6
| 71359 ||  || — || January 5, 2000 || Socorro || LINEAR || EOS || align=right | 5.7 km || 
|-id=360 bgcolor=#d6d6d6
| 71360 ||  || — || January 5, 2000 || Socorro || LINEAR || EOS || align=right | 5.6 km || 
|-id=361 bgcolor=#d6d6d6
| 71361 ||  || — || January 5, 2000 || Socorro || LINEAR || EOS || align=right | 5.0 km || 
|-id=362 bgcolor=#d6d6d6
| 71362 ||  || — || January 3, 2000 || Socorro || LINEAR || — || align=right | 6.3 km || 
|-id=363 bgcolor=#d6d6d6
| 71363 ||  || — || January 4, 2000 || Socorro || LINEAR || — || align=right | 4.5 km || 
|-id=364 bgcolor=#E9E9E9
| 71364 ||  || — || January 4, 2000 || Socorro || LINEAR || — || align=right | 4.0 km || 
|-id=365 bgcolor=#d6d6d6
| 71365 ||  || — || January 4, 2000 || Socorro || LINEAR || — || align=right | 7.7 km || 
|-id=366 bgcolor=#d6d6d6
| 71366 ||  || — || January 4, 2000 || Socorro || LINEAR || — || align=right | 3.9 km || 
|-id=367 bgcolor=#E9E9E9
| 71367 ||  || — || January 4, 2000 || Socorro || LINEAR || — || align=right | 8.9 km || 
|-id=368 bgcolor=#d6d6d6
| 71368 ||  || — || January 4, 2000 || Socorro || LINEAR || — || align=right | 8.3 km || 
|-id=369 bgcolor=#E9E9E9
| 71369 ||  || — || January 5, 2000 || Socorro || LINEAR || ADE || align=right | 8.3 km || 
|-id=370 bgcolor=#fefefe
| 71370 ||  || — || January 5, 2000 || Socorro || LINEAR || KLI || align=right | 3.6 km || 
|-id=371 bgcolor=#E9E9E9
| 71371 ||  || — || January 5, 2000 || Socorro || LINEAR || EUN || align=right | 4.2 km || 
|-id=372 bgcolor=#E9E9E9
| 71372 ||  || — || January 5, 2000 || Socorro || LINEAR || — || align=right | 2.8 km || 
|-id=373 bgcolor=#E9E9E9
| 71373 ||  || — || January 5, 2000 || Socorro || LINEAR || — || align=right | 6.2 km || 
|-id=374 bgcolor=#E9E9E9
| 71374 ||  || — || January 5, 2000 || Socorro || LINEAR || — || align=right | 5.4 km || 
|-id=375 bgcolor=#d6d6d6
| 71375 ||  || — || January 5, 2000 || Socorro || LINEAR || — || align=right | 9.3 km || 
|-id=376 bgcolor=#d6d6d6
| 71376 ||  || — || January 5, 2000 || Socorro || LINEAR || — || align=right | 6.1 km || 
|-id=377 bgcolor=#d6d6d6
| 71377 ||  || — || January 6, 2000 || Socorro || LINEAR || — || align=right | 5.2 km || 
|-id=378 bgcolor=#d6d6d6
| 71378 ||  || — || January 6, 2000 || Socorro || LINEAR || — || align=right | 4.7 km || 
|-id=379 bgcolor=#fefefe
| 71379 ||  || — || January 7, 2000 || Socorro || LINEAR || — || align=right | 3.2 km || 
|-id=380 bgcolor=#d6d6d6
| 71380 ||  || — || January 5, 2000 || Socorro || LINEAR || — || align=right | 4.3 km || 
|-id=381 bgcolor=#fefefe
| 71381 ||  || — || January 7, 2000 || Socorro || LINEAR || — || align=right | 4.0 km || 
|-id=382 bgcolor=#E9E9E9
| 71382 ||  || — || January 7, 2000 || Socorro || LINEAR || DOR || align=right | 7.6 km || 
|-id=383 bgcolor=#E9E9E9
| 71383 ||  || — || January 5, 2000 || Kvistaberg || UDAS || — || align=right | 3.8 km || 
|-id=384 bgcolor=#fefefe
| 71384 ||  || — || January 8, 2000 || Socorro || LINEAR || V || align=right | 2.1 km || 
|-id=385 bgcolor=#fefefe
| 71385 ||  || — || January 8, 2000 || Socorro || LINEAR || — || align=right | 2.3 km || 
|-id=386 bgcolor=#d6d6d6
| 71386 ||  || — || January 6, 2000 || Višnjan Observatory || K. Korlević || HYG || align=right | 8.4 km || 
|-id=387 bgcolor=#E9E9E9
| 71387 ||  || — || January 2, 2000 || Socorro || LINEAR || EUN || align=right | 3.4 km || 
|-id=388 bgcolor=#E9E9E9
| 71388 ||  || — || January 3, 2000 || Socorro || LINEAR || HEN || align=right | 2.7 km || 
|-id=389 bgcolor=#E9E9E9
| 71389 ||  || — || January 3, 2000 || Socorro || LINEAR || — || align=right | 3.9 km || 
|-id=390 bgcolor=#d6d6d6
| 71390 ||  || — || January 3, 2000 || Socorro || LINEAR || — || align=right | 5.9 km || 
|-id=391 bgcolor=#d6d6d6
| 71391 ||  || — || January 3, 2000 || Socorro || LINEAR || — || align=right | 6.2 km || 
|-id=392 bgcolor=#E9E9E9
| 71392 ||  || — || January 5, 2000 || Socorro || LINEAR || — || align=right | 5.2 km || 
|-id=393 bgcolor=#fefefe
| 71393 ||  || — || January 5, 2000 || Socorro || LINEAR || — || align=right | 3.1 km || 
|-id=394 bgcolor=#E9E9E9
| 71394 ||  || — || January 5, 2000 || Socorro || LINEAR || — || align=right | 5.2 km || 
|-id=395 bgcolor=#d6d6d6
| 71395 ||  || — || January 5, 2000 || Socorro || LINEAR || — || align=right | 5.5 km || 
|-id=396 bgcolor=#d6d6d6
| 71396 ||  || — || January 8, 2000 || Socorro || LINEAR || SAN || align=right | 4.5 km || 
|-id=397 bgcolor=#d6d6d6
| 71397 ||  || — || January 8, 2000 || Socorro || LINEAR || — || align=right | 9.0 km || 
|-id=398 bgcolor=#E9E9E9
| 71398 ||  || — || January 7, 2000 || Socorro || LINEAR || MAR || align=right | 3.3 km || 
|-id=399 bgcolor=#E9E9E9
| 71399 ||  || — || January 7, 2000 || Socorro || LINEAR || — || align=right | 2.5 km || 
|-id=400 bgcolor=#E9E9E9
| 71400 ||  || — || January 7, 2000 || Socorro || LINEAR || — || align=right | 6.5 km || 
|}

71401–71500 

|-bgcolor=#E9E9E9
| 71401 ||  || — || January 7, 2000 || Socorro || LINEAR || PAE || align=right | 5.8 km || 
|-id=402 bgcolor=#E9E9E9
| 71402 ||  || — || January 7, 2000 || Socorro || LINEAR || — || align=right | 4.6 km || 
|-id=403 bgcolor=#E9E9E9
| 71403 ||  || — || January 7, 2000 || Socorro || LINEAR || EUN || align=right | 4.3 km || 
|-id=404 bgcolor=#E9E9E9
| 71404 ||  || — || January 7, 2000 || Socorro || LINEAR || — || align=right | 6.2 km || 
|-id=405 bgcolor=#E9E9E9
| 71405 ||  || — || January 7, 2000 || Socorro || LINEAR || GEF || align=right | 3.3 km || 
|-id=406 bgcolor=#E9E9E9
| 71406 ||  || — || January 7, 2000 || Socorro || LINEAR || ADE || align=right | 6.5 km || 
|-id=407 bgcolor=#E9E9E9
| 71407 ||  || — || January 7, 2000 || Socorro || LINEAR || — || align=right | 3.5 km || 
|-id=408 bgcolor=#d6d6d6
| 71408 ||  || — || January 7, 2000 || Socorro || LINEAR || EOS || align=right | 4.6 km || 
|-id=409 bgcolor=#E9E9E9
| 71409 ||  || — || January 7, 2000 || Socorro || LINEAR || MIT || align=right | 6.3 km || 
|-id=410 bgcolor=#E9E9E9
| 71410 ||  || — || January 7, 2000 || Socorro || LINEAR || RAF || align=right | 3.6 km || 
|-id=411 bgcolor=#d6d6d6
| 71411 ||  || — || January 7, 2000 || Socorro || LINEAR || EOS || align=right | 5.1 km || 
|-id=412 bgcolor=#E9E9E9
| 71412 ||  || — || January 7, 2000 || Socorro || LINEAR || GEF || align=right | 3.1 km || 
|-id=413 bgcolor=#E9E9E9
| 71413 ||  || — || January 8, 2000 || Socorro || LINEAR || — || align=right | 5.9 km || 
|-id=414 bgcolor=#E9E9E9
| 71414 ||  || — || January 8, 2000 || Socorro || LINEAR || ADE || align=right | 7.8 km || 
|-id=415 bgcolor=#E9E9E9
| 71415 ||  || — || January 8, 2000 || Socorro || LINEAR || — || align=right | 3.4 km || 
|-id=416 bgcolor=#E9E9E9
| 71416 ||  || — || January 8, 2000 || Socorro || LINEAR || EUN || align=right | 3.1 km || 
|-id=417 bgcolor=#E9E9E9
| 71417 ||  || — || January 8, 2000 || Socorro || LINEAR || — || align=right | 6.1 km || 
|-id=418 bgcolor=#E9E9E9
| 71418 ||  || — || January 8, 2000 || Socorro || LINEAR || MIT || align=right | 6.9 km || 
|-id=419 bgcolor=#E9E9E9
| 71419 ||  || — || January 8, 2000 || Socorro || LINEAR || — || align=right | 6.2 km || 
|-id=420 bgcolor=#E9E9E9
| 71420 ||  || — || January 8, 2000 || Socorro || LINEAR || EUN || align=right | 3.6 km || 
|-id=421 bgcolor=#E9E9E9
| 71421 ||  || — || January 8, 2000 || Socorro || LINEAR || EUN || align=right | 3.0 km || 
|-id=422 bgcolor=#E9E9E9
| 71422 ||  || — || January 8, 2000 || Socorro || LINEAR || GEF || align=right | 2.9 km || 
|-id=423 bgcolor=#E9E9E9
| 71423 ||  || — || January 8, 2000 || Socorro || LINEAR || PAE || align=right | 4.5 km || 
|-id=424 bgcolor=#d6d6d6
| 71424 ||  || — || January 8, 2000 || Socorro || LINEAR || — || align=right | 4.2 km || 
|-id=425 bgcolor=#d6d6d6
| 71425 ||  || — || January 8, 2000 || Socorro || LINEAR || URS || align=right | 8.9 km || 
|-id=426 bgcolor=#d6d6d6
| 71426 ||  || — || January 8, 2000 || Socorro || LINEAR || VER || align=right | 8.1 km || 
|-id=427 bgcolor=#E9E9E9
| 71427 ||  || — || January 9, 2000 || Socorro || LINEAR || — || align=right | 3.7 km || 
|-id=428 bgcolor=#E9E9E9
| 71428 ||  || — || January 9, 2000 || Socorro || LINEAR || — || align=right | 6.2 km || 
|-id=429 bgcolor=#E9E9E9
| 71429 ||  || — || January 9, 2000 || Socorro || LINEAR || — || align=right | 6.1 km || 
|-id=430 bgcolor=#d6d6d6
| 71430 ||  || — || January 9, 2000 || Socorro || LINEAR || TIR || align=right | 7.7 km || 
|-id=431 bgcolor=#E9E9E9
| 71431 ||  || — || January 10, 2000 || Socorro || LINEAR || EUN || align=right | 2.4 km || 
|-id=432 bgcolor=#E9E9E9
| 71432 ||  || — || January 10, 2000 || Socorro || LINEAR || ADE || align=right | 6.6 km || 
|-id=433 bgcolor=#d6d6d6
| 71433 ||  || — || January 10, 2000 || Socorro || LINEAR || — || align=right | 5.1 km || 
|-id=434 bgcolor=#E9E9E9
| 71434 ||  || — || January 15, 2000 || Višnjan Observatory || K. Korlević || GEF || align=right | 3.9 km || 
|-id=435 bgcolor=#d6d6d6
| 71435 ||  || — || January 3, 2000 || Kitt Peak || Spacewatch || — || align=right | 5.3 km || 
|-id=436 bgcolor=#E9E9E9
| 71436 ||  || — || January 4, 2000 || Kitt Peak || Spacewatch || — || align=right | 3.8 km || 
|-id=437 bgcolor=#d6d6d6
| 71437 ||  || — || January 4, 2000 || Kitt Peak || Spacewatch || THM || align=right | 5.5 km || 
|-id=438 bgcolor=#d6d6d6
| 71438 ||  || — || January 6, 2000 || Kitt Peak || Spacewatch || — || align=right | 4.1 km || 
|-id=439 bgcolor=#d6d6d6
| 71439 ||  || — || January 6, 2000 || Kitt Peak || Spacewatch || EOS || align=right | 4.6 km || 
|-id=440 bgcolor=#d6d6d6
| 71440 ||  || — || January 12, 2000 || Kitt Peak || Spacewatch || — || align=right | 8.2 km || 
|-id=441 bgcolor=#E9E9E9
| 71441 ||  || — || January 13, 2000 || Kitt Peak || Spacewatch || HOF || align=right | 4.6 km || 
|-id=442 bgcolor=#E9E9E9
| 71442 ||  || — || January 3, 2000 || Socorro || LINEAR || — || align=right | 6.3 km || 
|-id=443 bgcolor=#d6d6d6
| 71443 ||  || — || January 3, 2000 || Socorro || LINEAR || — || align=right | 8.3 km || 
|-id=444 bgcolor=#d6d6d6
| 71444 ||  || — || January 3, 2000 || Socorro || LINEAR || — || align=right | 8.7 km || 
|-id=445 bgcolor=#E9E9E9
| 71445 Marc ||  ||  || January 4, 2000 || Anderson Mesa || L. H. Wasserman || — || align=right | 2.4 km || 
|-id=446 bgcolor=#d6d6d6
| 71446 ||  || — || January 5, 2000 || Anderson Mesa || LONEOS || — || align=right | 10 km || 
|-id=447 bgcolor=#d6d6d6
| 71447 ||  || — || January 6, 2000 || Kitt Peak || Spacewatch || KOR || align=right | 3.4 km || 
|-id=448 bgcolor=#E9E9E9
| 71448 ||  || — || January 7, 2000 || Socorro || LINEAR || — || align=right | 4.0 km || 
|-id=449 bgcolor=#d6d6d6
| 71449 ||  || — || January 7, 2000 || Anderson Mesa || LONEOS || — || align=right | 13 km || 
|-id=450 bgcolor=#d6d6d6
| 71450 ||  || — || January 7, 2000 || Anderson Mesa || LONEOS || EOS || align=right | 4.8 km || 
|-id=451 bgcolor=#E9E9E9
| 71451 ||  || — || January 7, 2000 || Anderson Mesa || LONEOS || — || align=right | 3.8 km || 
|-id=452 bgcolor=#d6d6d6
| 71452 ||  || — || January 7, 2000 || Socorro || LINEAR || TIR || align=right | 5.2 km || 
|-id=453 bgcolor=#E9E9E9
| 71453 ||  || — || January 8, 2000 || Socorro || LINEAR || — || align=right | 3.6 km || 
|-id=454 bgcolor=#E9E9E9
| 71454 ||  || — || January 9, 2000 || Socorro || LINEAR || — || align=right | 4.2 km || 
|-id=455 bgcolor=#E9E9E9
| 71455 ||  || — || January 9, 2000 || Socorro || LINEAR || — || align=right | 2.5 km || 
|-id=456 bgcolor=#d6d6d6
| 71456 ||  || — || January 2, 2000 || Socorro || LINEAR || VER || align=right | 6.2 km || 
|-id=457 bgcolor=#E9E9E9
| 71457 ||  || — || January 2, 2000 || Socorro || LINEAR || — || align=right | 7.6 km || 
|-id=458 bgcolor=#d6d6d6
| 71458 || 2000 BU || — || January 26, 2000 || Farra d'Isonzo || Farra d'Isonzo || — || align=right | 6.1 km || 
|-id=459 bgcolor=#E9E9E9
| 71459 ||  || — || January 25, 2000 || Socorro || LINEAR || — || align=right | 3.1 km || 
|-id=460 bgcolor=#d6d6d6
| 71460 ||  || — || January 26, 2000 || Višnjan Observatory || K. Korlević || — || align=right | 6.6 km || 
|-id=461 bgcolor=#d6d6d6
| 71461 Chowmeeyee ||  ||  || January 28, 2000 || Rock Finder || W. K. Y. Yeung || — || align=right | 4.9 km || 
|-id=462 bgcolor=#E9E9E9
| 71462 ||  || — || January 21, 2000 || Socorro || LINEAR || EUN || align=right | 3.9 km || 
|-id=463 bgcolor=#E9E9E9
| 71463 ||  || — || January 21, 2000 || Socorro || LINEAR || — || align=right | 3.8 km || 
|-id=464 bgcolor=#d6d6d6
| 71464 ||  || — || January 27, 2000 || Socorro || LINEAR || URS || align=right | 9.5 km || 
|-id=465 bgcolor=#d6d6d6
| 71465 ||  || — || January 29, 2000 || Socorro || LINEAR || — || align=right | 5.2 km || 
|-id=466 bgcolor=#d6d6d6
| 71466 ||  || — || January 26, 2000 || Kitt Peak || Spacewatch || THM || align=right | 5.0 km || 
|-id=467 bgcolor=#fefefe
| 71467 ||  || — || January 28, 2000 || Kitt Peak || Spacewatch || NYS || align=right | 2.4 km || 
|-id=468 bgcolor=#d6d6d6
| 71468 ||  || — || January 24, 2000 || Rock Finder || W. K. Y. Yeung || EOS || align=right | 4.0 km || 
|-id=469 bgcolor=#d6d6d6
| 71469 ||  || — || January 28, 2000 || Oizumi || T. Kobayashi || — || align=right | 6.1 km || 
|-id=470 bgcolor=#d6d6d6
| 71470 ||  || — || January 31, 2000 || Oizumi || T. Kobayashi || — || align=right | 4.7 km || 
|-id=471 bgcolor=#d6d6d6
| 71471 ||  || — || January 27, 2000 || Socorro || LINEAR || TIR || align=right | 7.1 km || 
|-id=472 bgcolor=#d6d6d6
| 71472 ||  || — || January 27, 2000 || Socorro || LINEAR || — || align=right | 6.2 km || 
|-id=473 bgcolor=#E9E9E9
| 71473 ||  || — || January 30, 2000 || Socorro || LINEAR || EUN || align=right | 3.1 km || 
|-id=474 bgcolor=#d6d6d6
| 71474 ||  || — || January 30, 2000 || Socorro || LINEAR || — || align=right | 7.9 km || 
|-id=475 bgcolor=#E9E9E9
| 71475 ||  || — || January 30, 2000 || Socorro || LINEAR || PAD || align=right | 5.0 km || 
|-id=476 bgcolor=#d6d6d6
| 71476 ||  || — || January 30, 2000 || Socorro || LINEAR || — || align=right | 5.0 km || 
|-id=477 bgcolor=#d6d6d6
| 71477 ||  || — || January 29, 2000 || Socorro || LINEAR || — || align=right | 9.3 km || 
|-id=478 bgcolor=#d6d6d6
| 71478 ||  || — || January 29, 2000 || Socorro || LINEAR || EOS || align=right | 4.5 km || 
|-id=479 bgcolor=#d6d6d6
| 71479 ||  || — || January 30, 2000 || Socorro || LINEAR || THM || align=right | 5.8 km || 
|-id=480 bgcolor=#d6d6d6
| 71480 Roberthatt ||  ||  || January 30, 2000 || Catalina || CSS || TRP || align=right | 7.3 km || 
|-id=481 bgcolor=#d6d6d6
| 71481 ||  || — || January 30, 2000 || Socorro || LINEAR || — || align=right | 4.7 km || 
|-id=482 bgcolor=#d6d6d6
| 71482 Jennamarie ||  ||  || January 28, 2000 || Kitt Peak || Spacewatch || — || align=right | 8.4 km || 
|-id=483 bgcolor=#d6d6d6
| 71483 Dickgottfried ||  ||  || January 30, 2000 || Catalina || CSS || — || align=right | 4.4 km || 
|-id=484 bgcolor=#d6d6d6
| 71484 ||  || — || January 30, 2000 || Kitt Peak || Spacewatch || EOS || align=right | 5.3 km || 
|-id=485 bgcolor=#d6d6d6
| 71485 Brettman ||  ||  || January 30, 2000 || Catalina || CSS || — || align=right | 4.7 km || 
|-id=486 bgcolor=#d6d6d6
| 71486 ||  || — || January 28, 2000 || Kitt Peak || Spacewatch || — || align=right | 5.5 km || 
|-id=487 bgcolor=#d6d6d6
| 71487 ||  || — || January 28, 2000 || Kitt Peak || Spacewatch || — || align=right | 6.1 km || 
|-id=488 bgcolor=#E9E9E9
| 71488 ||  || — || January 21, 2000 || Socorro || LINEAR || MAR || align=right | 3.8 km || 
|-id=489 bgcolor=#d6d6d6
| 71489 Dynamocamp ||  ||  || February 4, 2000 || San Marcello || L. Tesi, M. Tombelli || THM || align=right | 8.1 km || 
|-id=490 bgcolor=#d6d6d6
| 71490 ||  || — || February 2, 2000 || Socorro || LINEAR || EOS || align=right | 4.7 km || 
|-id=491 bgcolor=#d6d6d6
| 71491 ||  || — || February 2, 2000 || Socorro || LINEAR || EOS || align=right | 6.1 km || 
|-id=492 bgcolor=#d6d6d6
| 71492 ||  || — || February 2, 2000 || Socorro || LINEAR || — || align=right | 5.0 km || 
|-id=493 bgcolor=#d6d6d6
| 71493 ||  || — || February 2, 2000 || Socorro || LINEAR || — || align=right | 4.2 km || 
|-id=494 bgcolor=#E9E9E9
| 71494 ||  || — || February 2, 2000 || Socorro || LINEAR || GEF || align=right | 4.6 km || 
|-id=495 bgcolor=#d6d6d6
| 71495 ||  || — || February 2, 2000 || Socorro || LINEAR || — || align=right | 5.7 km || 
|-id=496 bgcolor=#E9E9E9
| 71496 ||  || — || February 2, 2000 || Socorro || LINEAR || — || align=right | 5.5 km || 
|-id=497 bgcolor=#d6d6d6
| 71497 ||  || — || February 2, 2000 || Socorro || LINEAR || HYG || align=right | 9.0 km || 
|-id=498 bgcolor=#d6d6d6
| 71498 ||  || — || February 2, 2000 || Socorro || LINEAR || EOS || align=right | 5.9 km || 
|-id=499 bgcolor=#d6d6d6
| 71499 ||  || — || February 2, 2000 || Socorro || LINEAR || KOR || align=right | 2.9 km || 
|-id=500 bgcolor=#d6d6d6
| 71500 ||  || — || February 2, 2000 || Socorro || LINEAR || — || align=right | 6.0 km || 
|}

71501–71600 

|-bgcolor=#d6d6d6
| 71501 ||  || — || February 2, 2000 || Socorro || LINEAR || — || align=right | 8.7 km || 
|-id=502 bgcolor=#d6d6d6
| 71502 ||  || — || February 2, 2000 || Socorro || LINEAR || HYG || align=right | 7.4 km || 
|-id=503 bgcolor=#d6d6d6
| 71503 ||  || — || February 2, 2000 || Socorro || LINEAR || — || align=right | 6.0 km || 
|-id=504 bgcolor=#d6d6d6
| 71504 ||  || — || February 2, 2000 || Socorro || LINEAR || — || align=right | 7.1 km || 
|-id=505 bgcolor=#d6d6d6
| 71505 ||  || — || February 2, 2000 || Socorro || LINEAR || HYG || align=right | 8.8 km || 
|-id=506 bgcolor=#d6d6d6
| 71506 ||  || — || February 2, 2000 || Socorro || LINEAR || — || align=right | 7.7 km || 
|-id=507 bgcolor=#d6d6d6
| 71507 ||  || — || February 4, 2000 || Ondřejov || P. Kušnirák || — || align=right | 3.3 km || 
|-id=508 bgcolor=#d6d6d6
| 71508 ||  || — || February 2, 2000 || Socorro || LINEAR || 7:4 || align=right | 8.3 km || 
|-id=509 bgcolor=#d6d6d6
| 71509 ||  || — || February 3, 2000 || Socorro || LINEAR || — || align=right | 7.8 km || 
|-id=510 bgcolor=#E9E9E9
| 71510 ||  || — || February 2, 2000 || Socorro || LINEAR || — || align=right | 2.8 km || 
|-id=511 bgcolor=#d6d6d6
| 71511 ||  || — || February 2, 2000 || Socorro || LINEAR || — || align=right | 13 km || 
|-id=512 bgcolor=#E9E9E9
| 71512 ||  || — || February 2, 2000 || Socorro || LINEAR || DOR || align=right | 7.1 km || 
|-id=513 bgcolor=#d6d6d6
| 71513 ||  || — || February 3, 2000 || Socorro || LINEAR || EOS || align=right | 4.3 km || 
|-id=514 bgcolor=#d6d6d6
| 71514 ||  || — || February 3, 2000 || Socorro || LINEAR || — || align=right | 8.2 km || 
|-id=515 bgcolor=#d6d6d6
| 71515 ||  || — || February 4, 2000 || Socorro || LINEAR || — || align=right | 5.5 km || 
|-id=516 bgcolor=#d6d6d6
| 71516 ||  || — || February 4, 2000 || Socorro || LINEAR || — || align=right | 5.3 km || 
|-id=517 bgcolor=#d6d6d6
| 71517 ||  || — || February 2, 2000 || Socorro || LINEAR || — || align=right | 7.5 km || 
|-id=518 bgcolor=#d6d6d6
| 71518 ||  || — || February 2, 2000 || Socorro || LINEAR || — || align=right | 5.1 km || 
|-id=519 bgcolor=#d6d6d6
| 71519 ||  || — || February 2, 2000 || Socorro || LINEAR || — || align=right | 4.8 km || 
|-id=520 bgcolor=#d6d6d6
| 71520 ||  || — || February 1, 2000 || Kitt Peak || Spacewatch || — || align=right | 9.1 km || 
|-id=521 bgcolor=#d6d6d6
| 71521 ||  || — || February 7, 2000 || Socorro || LINEAR || — || align=right | 5.4 km || 
|-id=522 bgcolor=#d6d6d6
| 71522 ||  || — || February 2, 2000 || Socorro || LINEAR || EOS || align=right | 4.3 km || 
|-id=523 bgcolor=#d6d6d6
| 71523 ||  || — || February 10, 2000 || Višnjan Observatory || K. Korlević || — || align=right | 4.6 km || 
|-id=524 bgcolor=#d6d6d6
| 71524 ||  || — || February 7, 2000 || Kitt Peak || Spacewatch || THM || align=right | 8.4 km || 
|-id=525 bgcolor=#d6d6d6
| 71525 ||  || — || February 8, 2000 || Kitt Peak || Spacewatch || — || align=right | 4.4 km || 
|-id=526 bgcolor=#d6d6d6
| 71526 ||  || — || February 4, 2000 || Socorro || LINEAR || — || align=right | 7.0 km || 
|-id=527 bgcolor=#d6d6d6
| 71527 ||  || — || February 4, 2000 || Socorro || LINEAR || THM || align=right | 6.8 km || 
|-id=528 bgcolor=#d6d6d6
| 71528 ||  || — || February 4, 2000 || Socorro || LINEAR || — || align=right | 6.3 km || 
|-id=529 bgcolor=#d6d6d6
| 71529 ||  || — || February 4, 2000 || Socorro || LINEAR || HYG || align=right | 6.1 km || 
|-id=530 bgcolor=#d6d6d6
| 71530 ||  || — || February 4, 2000 || Socorro || LINEAR || — || align=right | 3.5 km || 
|-id=531 bgcolor=#d6d6d6
| 71531 ||  || — || February 4, 2000 || Socorro || LINEAR || — || align=right | 6.7 km || 
|-id=532 bgcolor=#d6d6d6
| 71532 ||  || — || February 6, 2000 || Socorro || LINEAR || THM || align=right | 8.7 km || 
|-id=533 bgcolor=#d6d6d6
| 71533 ||  || — || February 6, 2000 || Socorro || LINEAR || — || align=right | 8.2 km || 
|-id=534 bgcolor=#d6d6d6
| 71534 ||  || — || February 6, 2000 || Socorro || LINEAR || ALA || align=right | 11 km || 
|-id=535 bgcolor=#d6d6d6
| 71535 ||  || — || February 8, 2000 || Socorro || LINEAR || — || align=right | 6.6 km || 
|-id=536 bgcolor=#d6d6d6
| 71536 ||  || — || February 8, 2000 || Socorro || LINEAR || TEL || align=right | 4.9 km || 
|-id=537 bgcolor=#d6d6d6
| 71537 ||  || — || February 8, 2000 || Kitt Peak || Spacewatch || — || align=right | 6.0 km || 
|-id=538 bgcolor=#E9E9E9
| 71538 Robertfried ||  ||  || February 5, 2000 || Catalina || CSS || EUN || align=right | 3.1 km || 
|-id=539 bgcolor=#d6d6d6
| 71539 VanZandt ||  ||  || February 7, 2000 || Catalina || CSS || — || align=right | 4.3 km || 
|-id=540 bgcolor=#d6d6d6
| 71540 ||  || — || February 10, 2000 || Kitt Peak || Spacewatch || — || align=right | 7.2 km || 
|-id=541 bgcolor=#d6d6d6
| 71541 ||  || — || February 3, 2000 || Socorro || LINEAR || — || align=right | 5.4 km || 
|-id=542 bgcolor=#d6d6d6
| 71542 ||  || — || February 3, 2000 || Socorro || LINEAR || — || align=right | 6.9 km || 
|-id=543 bgcolor=#d6d6d6
| 71543 ||  || — || February 2, 2000 || Socorro || LINEAR || — || align=right | 9.2 km || 
|-id=544 bgcolor=#d6d6d6
| 71544 ||  || — || February 3, 2000 || Socorro || LINEAR || — || align=right | 5.2 km || 
|-id=545 bgcolor=#d6d6d6
| 71545 ||  || — || February 3, 2000 || Socorro || LINEAR || — || align=right | 4.4 km || 
|-id=546 bgcolor=#d6d6d6
| 71546 ||  || — || February 24, 2000 || Višnjan Observatory || K. Korlević, M. Jurić || THM || align=right | 6.0 km || 
|-id=547 bgcolor=#d6d6d6
| 71547 ||  || — || February 27, 2000 || Oizumi || T. Kobayashi || ELF || align=right | 13 km || 
|-id=548 bgcolor=#d6d6d6
| 71548 ||  || — || February 28, 2000 || Socorro || LINEAR || — || align=right | 11 km || 
|-id=549 bgcolor=#d6d6d6
| 71549 ||  || — || February 28, 2000 || Socorro || LINEAR || — || align=right | 5.7 km || 
|-id=550 bgcolor=#d6d6d6
| 71550 ||  || — || February 28, 2000 || Socorro || LINEAR || — || align=right | 7.6 km || 
|-id=551 bgcolor=#d6d6d6
| 71551 ||  || — || February 27, 2000 || Tebbutt || F. B. Zoltowski || — || align=right | 4.2 km || 
|-id=552 bgcolor=#d6d6d6
| 71552 ||  || — || February 28, 2000 || Kitt Peak || Spacewatch || THM || align=right | 6.1 km || 
|-id=553 bgcolor=#d6d6d6
| 71553 ||  || — || February 28, 2000 || Kitt Peak || Spacewatch || — || align=right | 6.3 km || 
|-id=554 bgcolor=#fefefe
| 71554 ||  || — || February 27, 2000 || Kitt Peak || Spacewatch || V || align=right | 1.4 km || 
|-id=555 bgcolor=#d6d6d6
| 71555 ||  || — || February 27, 2000 || Catalina || CSS || — || align=right | 8.6 km || 
|-id=556 bgcolor=#d6d6d6
| 71556 Page ||  ||  || February 27, 2000 || Jornada || D. S. Dixon || — || align=right | 4.2 km || 
|-id=557 bgcolor=#d6d6d6
| 71557 ||  || — || February 29, 2000 || Socorro || LINEAR || — || align=right | 4.4 km || 
|-id=558 bgcolor=#d6d6d6
| 71558 ||  || — || February 29, 2000 || Socorro || LINEAR || — || align=right | 8.6 km || 
|-id=559 bgcolor=#d6d6d6
| 71559 ||  || — || February 29, 2000 || Socorro || LINEAR || — || align=right | 6.3 km || 
|-id=560 bgcolor=#d6d6d6
| 71560 ||  || — || February 29, 2000 || Socorro || LINEAR || — || align=right | 7.1 km || 
|-id=561 bgcolor=#d6d6d6
| 71561 ||  || — || February 29, 2000 || Socorro || LINEAR || THM || align=right | 4.7 km || 
|-id=562 bgcolor=#d6d6d6
| 71562 ||  || — || February 29, 2000 || Socorro || LINEAR || — || align=right | 4.1 km || 
|-id=563 bgcolor=#d6d6d6
| 71563 ||  || — || February 29, 2000 || Socorro || LINEAR || — || align=right | 6.4 km || 
|-id=564 bgcolor=#d6d6d6
| 71564 ||  || — || February 29, 2000 || Socorro || LINEAR || THM || align=right | 6.9 km || 
|-id=565 bgcolor=#d6d6d6
| 71565 ||  || — || February 29, 2000 || Socorro || LINEAR || EOS || align=right | 4.6 km || 
|-id=566 bgcolor=#d6d6d6
| 71566 ||  || — || February 29, 2000 || Socorro || LINEAR || — || align=right | 7.5 km || 
|-id=567 bgcolor=#d6d6d6
| 71567 ||  || — || February 29, 2000 || Socorro || LINEAR || — || align=right | 4.7 km || 
|-id=568 bgcolor=#d6d6d6
| 71568 ||  || — || February 29, 2000 || Socorro || LINEAR || HYG || align=right | 7.0 km || 
|-id=569 bgcolor=#fefefe
| 71569 ||  || — || February 29, 2000 || Socorro || LINEAR || NYS || align=right | 1.4 km || 
|-id=570 bgcolor=#d6d6d6
| 71570 ||  || — || February 29, 2000 || Socorro || LINEAR || EOS || align=right | 4.7 km || 
|-id=571 bgcolor=#d6d6d6
| 71571 ||  || — || February 29, 2000 || Socorro || LINEAR || THM || align=right | 5.1 km || 
|-id=572 bgcolor=#d6d6d6
| 71572 ||  || — || February 29, 2000 || Socorro || LINEAR || EUP || align=right | 10 km || 
|-id=573 bgcolor=#d6d6d6
| 71573 ||  || — || February 29, 2000 || Socorro || LINEAR || — || align=right | 6.2 km || 
|-id=574 bgcolor=#d6d6d6
| 71574 ||  || — || February 29, 2000 || Socorro || LINEAR || — || align=right | 9.1 km || 
|-id=575 bgcolor=#d6d6d6
| 71575 ||  || — || February 29, 2000 || Socorro || LINEAR || — || align=right | 6.6 km || 
|-id=576 bgcolor=#d6d6d6
| 71576 ||  || — || February 29, 2000 || Socorro || LINEAR || — || align=right | 9.9 km || 
|-id=577 bgcolor=#d6d6d6
| 71577 ||  || — || February 29, 2000 || Socorro || LINEAR || THM || align=right | 7.0 km || 
|-id=578 bgcolor=#d6d6d6
| 71578 ||  || — || February 29, 2000 || Socorro || LINEAR || — || align=right | 4.6 km || 
|-id=579 bgcolor=#d6d6d6
| 71579 ||  || — || February 29, 2000 || Socorro || LINEAR || — || align=right | 4.4 km || 
|-id=580 bgcolor=#d6d6d6
| 71580 ||  || — || February 29, 2000 || Socorro || LINEAR || EOS || align=right | 4.1 km || 
|-id=581 bgcolor=#d6d6d6
| 71581 ||  || — || February 29, 2000 || Socorro || LINEAR || — || align=right | 4.6 km || 
|-id=582 bgcolor=#d6d6d6
| 71582 ||  || — || February 29, 2000 || Socorro || LINEAR || HYG || align=right | 8.8 km || 
|-id=583 bgcolor=#d6d6d6
| 71583 ||  || — || February 29, 2000 || Socorro || LINEAR || — || align=right | 5.9 km || 
|-id=584 bgcolor=#d6d6d6
| 71584 ||  || — || February 29, 2000 || Socorro || LINEAR || — || align=right | 6.3 km || 
|-id=585 bgcolor=#d6d6d6
| 71585 ||  || — || February 29, 2000 || Socorro || LINEAR || — || align=right | 6.3 km || 
|-id=586 bgcolor=#d6d6d6
| 71586 ||  || — || February 29, 2000 || Socorro || LINEAR || THM || align=right | 5.8 km || 
|-id=587 bgcolor=#d6d6d6
| 71587 ||  || — || February 29, 2000 || Socorro || LINEAR || — || align=right | 4.0 km || 
|-id=588 bgcolor=#d6d6d6
| 71588 ||  || — || February 29, 2000 || Socorro || LINEAR || HYG || align=right | 6.3 km || 
|-id=589 bgcolor=#d6d6d6
| 71589 ||  || — || February 29, 2000 || Socorro || LINEAR || — || align=right | 6.9 km || 
|-id=590 bgcolor=#d6d6d6
| 71590 ||  || — || February 29, 2000 || Socorro || LINEAR || — || align=right | 6.7 km || 
|-id=591 bgcolor=#d6d6d6
| 71591 ||  || — || February 29, 2000 || Socorro || LINEAR || — || align=right | 9.1 km || 
|-id=592 bgcolor=#d6d6d6
| 71592 ||  || — || February 29, 2000 || Socorro || LINEAR || — || align=right | 7.3 km || 
|-id=593 bgcolor=#d6d6d6
| 71593 ||  || — || February 29, 2000 || Socorro || LINEAR || THM || align=right | 5.8 km || 
|-id=594 bgcolor=#d6d6d6
| 71594 ||  || — || February 29, 2000 || Socorro || LINEAR || — || align=right | 9.9 km || 
|-id=595 bgcolor=#d6d6d6
| 71595 ||  || — || February 29, 2000 || Socorro || LINEAR || HYG || align=right | 7.0 km || 
|-id=596 bgcolor=#d6d6d6
| 71596 ||  || — || February 28, 2000 || Socorro || LINEAR || — || align=right | 9.1 km || 
|-id=597 bgcolor=#d6d6d6
| 71597 ||  || — || February 28, 2000 || Socorro || LINEAR || EOS || align=right | 4.1 km || 
|-id=598 bgcolor=#d6d6d6
| 71598 ||  || — || February 28, 2000 || Socorro || LINEAR || — || align=right | 6.2 km || 
|-id=599 bgcolor=#d6d6d6
| 71599 ||  || — || February 29, 2000 || Socorro || LINEAR || — || align=right | 6.0 km || 
|-id=600 bgcolor=#d6d6d6
| 71600 ||  || — || February 29, 2000 || Socorro || LINEAR || HYG || align=right | 7.0 km || 
|}

71601–71700 

|-bgcolor=#d6d6d6
| 71601 ||  || — || February 28, 2000 || Socorro || LINEAR || — || align=right | 6.7 km || 
|-id=602 bgcolor=#d6d6d6
| 71602 ||  || — || February 28, 2000 || Socorro || LINEAR || — || align=right | 6.4 km || 
|-id=603 bgcolor=#d6d6d6
| 71603 ||  || — || February 29, 2000 || Socorro || LINEAR || HYG || align=right | 8.0 km || 
|-id=604 bgcolor=#d6d6d6
| 71604 ||  || — || February 29, 2000 || Socorro || LINEAR || EOS || align=right | 4.3 km || 
|-id=605 bgcolor=#d6d6d6
| 71605 ||  || — || February 29, 2000 || Socorro || LINEAR || — || align=right | 3.6 km || 
|-id=606 bgcolor=#d6d6d6
| 71606 ||  || — || February 29, 2000 || Socorro || LINEAR || — || align=right | 8.1 km || 
|-id=607 bgcolor=#d6d6d6
| 71607 ||  || — || February 29, 2000 || Socorro || LINEAR || HYG || align=right | 8.3 km || 
|-id=608 bgcolor=#d6d6d6
| 71608 ||  || — || February 29, 2000 || Socorro || LINEAR || — || align=right | 7.0 km || 
|-id=609 bgcolor=#d6d6d6
| 71609 ||  || — || February 29, 2000 || Socorro || LINEAR || HYG || align=right | 6.3 km || 
|-id=610 bgcolor=#d6d6d6
| 71610 ||  || — || February 28, 2000 || Socorro || LINEAR || — || align=right | 7.0 km || 
|-id=611 bgcolor=#d6d6d6
| 71611 ||  || — || March 2, 2000 || Kitt Peak || Spacewatch || HYG || align=right | 6.7 km || 
|-id=612 bgcolor=#d6d6d6
| 71612 ||  || — || March 4, 2000 || Socorro || LINEAR || THB || align=right | 7.9 km || 
|-id=613 bgcolor=#d6d6d6
| 71613 ||  || — || March 4, 2000 || Socorro || LINEAR || — || align=right | 7.8 km || 
|-id=614 bgcolor=#d6d6d6
| 71614 ||  || — || March 4, 2000 || Socorro || LINEAR || — || align=right | 4.4 km || 
|-id=615 bgcolor=#E9E9E9
| 71615 Ramakers ||  ||  || March 3, 2000 || Catalina || CSS || — || align=right | 7.2 km || 
|-id=616 bgcolor=#d6d6d6
| 71616 ||  || — || March 4, 2000 || Socorro || LINEAR || — || align=right | 8.0 km || 
|-id=617 bgcolor=#d6d6d6
| 71617 ||  || — || March 4, 2000 || Socorro || LINEAR || EOS || align=right | 6.4 km || 
|-id=618 bgcolor=#d6d6d6
| 71618 ||  || — || March 4, 2000 || Socorro || LINEAR || — || align=right | 6.1 km || 
|-id=619 bgcolor=#d6d6d6
| 71619 ||  || — || March 8, 2000 || Socorro || LINEAR || — || align=right | 8.5 km || 
|-id=620 bgcolor=#d6d6d6
| 71620 ||  || — || March 8, 2000 || Socorro || LINEAR || HYG || align=right | 7.6 km || 
|-id=621 bgcolor=#d6d6d6
| 71621 ||  || — || March 9, 2000 || Socorro || LINEAR || HYG || align=right | 6.3 km || 
|-id=622 bgcolor=#d6d6d6
| 71622 ||  || — || March 9, 2000 || Socorro || LINEAR || — || align=right | 4.4 km || 
|-id=623 bgcolor=#d6d6d6
| 71623 ||  || — || March 9, 2000 || Kitt Peak || Spacewatch || THM || align=right | 5.0 km || 
|-id=624 bgcolor=#d6d6d6
| 71624 ||  || — || March 8, 2000 || Socorro || LINEAR || — || align=right | 4.4 km || 
|-id=625 bgcolor=#d6d6d6
| 71625 ||  || — || March 10, 2000 || Socorro || LINEAR || — || align=right | 6.3 km || 
|-id=626 bgcolor=#d6d6d6
| 71626 ||  || — || March 10, 2000 || Socorro || LINEAR || KOR || align=right | 4.4 km || 
|-id=627 bgcolor=#d6d6d6
| 71627 ||  || — || March 10, 2000 || Socorro || LINEAR || 7:4 || align=right | 7.4 km || 
|-id=628 bgcolor=#d6d6d6
| 71628 ||  || — || March 10, 2000 || Socorro || LINEAR || HYG || align=right | 6.4 km || 
|-id=629 bgcolor=#d6d6d6
| 71629 ||  || — || March 10, 2000 || Socorro || LINEAR || HYG || align=right | 6.9 km || 
|-id=630 bgcolor=#d6d6d6
| 71630 ||  || — || March 6, 2000 || Reedy Creek || J. Broughton || — || align=right | 4.5 km || 
|-id=631 bgcolor=#E9E9E9
| 71631 ||  || — || March 5, 2000 || Socorro || LINEAR || — || align=right | 6.2 km || 
|-id=632 bgcolor=#d6d6d6
| 71632 ||  || — || March 5, 2000 || Socorro || LINEAR || — || align=right | 6.0 km || 
|-id=633 bgcolor=#d6d6d6
| 71633 ||  || — || March 5, 2000 || Socorro || LINEAR || — || align=right | 6.0 km || 
|-id=634 bgcolor=#d6d6d6
| 71634 ||  || — || March 5, 2000 || Socorro || LINEAR || HYG || align=right | 8.4 km || 
|-id=635 bgcolor=#d6d6d6
| 71635 ||  || — || March 5, 2000 || Socorro || LINEAR || VER || align=right | 6.8 km || 
|-id=636 bgcolor=#d6d6d6
| 71636 ||  || — || March 5, 2000 || Socorro || LINEAR || EOS || align=right | 4.5 km || 
|-id=637 bgcolor=#E9E9E9
| 71637 ||  || — || March 5, 2000 || Socorro || LINEAR || — || align=right | 7.2 km || 
|-id=638 bgcolor=#d6d6d6
| 71638 ||  || — || March 9, 2000 || Socorro || LINEAR || EUP || align=right | 12 km || 
|-id=639 bgcolor=#d6d6d6
| 71639 ||  || — || March 9, 2000 || Socorro || LINEAR || — || align=right | 5.7 km || 
|-id=640 bgcolor=#d6d6d6
| 71640 ||  || — || March 9, 2000 || Socorro || LINEAR || EMA || align=right | 7.5 km || 
|-id=641 bgcolor=#E9E9E9
| 71641 ||  || — || March 12, 2000 || Socorro || LINEAR || — || align=right | 5.9 km || 
|-id=642 bgcolor=#d6d6d6
| 71642 ||  || — || March 11, 2000 || Socorro || LINEAR || — || align=right | 7.1 km || 
|-id=643 bgcolor=#d6d6d6
| 71643 ||  || — || March 12, 2000 || Socorro || LINEAR || — || align=right | 4.7 km || 
|-id=644 bgcolor=#d6d6d6
| 71644 ||  || — || March 11, 2000 || Anderson Mesa || LONEOS || — || align=right | 6.0 km || 
|-id=645 bgcolor=#d6d6d6
| 71645 ||  || — || March 8, 2000 || Haleakala || NEAT || EOS || align=right | 5.5 km || 
|-id=646 bgcolor=#d6d6d6
| 71646 ||  || — || March 8, 2000 || Haleakala || NEAT || — || align=right | 8.2 km || 
|-id=647 bgcolor=#d6d6d6
| 71647 ||  || — || March 8, 2000 || Haleakala || NEAT || — || align=right | 6.3 km || 
|-id=648 bgcolor=#E9E9E9
| 71648 ||  || — || March 9, 2000 || Socorro || LINEAR || — || align=right | 6.1 km || 
|-id=649 bgcolor=#d6d6d6
| 71649 ||  || — || March 9, 2000 || Socorro || LINEAR || HYG || align=right | 6.1 km || 
|-id=650 bgcolor=#d6d6d6
| 71650 ||  || — || March 9, 2000 || Kitt Peak || Spacewatch || THM || align=right | 5.4 km || 
|-id=651 bgcolor=#d6d6d6
| 71651 ||  || — || March 11, 2000 || Anderson Mesa || LONEOS || — || align=right | 8.4 km || 
|-id=652 bgcolor=#d6d6d6
| 71652 ||  || — || March 11, 2000 || Anderson Mesa || LONEOS || EOS || align=right | 5.0 km || 
|-id=653 bgcolor=#d6d6d6
| 71653 ||  || — || March 11, 2000 || Anderson Mesa || LONEOS || EOS || align=right | 6.1 km || 
|-id=654 bgcolor=#E9E9E9
| 71654 ||  || — || March 11, 2000 || Anderson Mesa || LONEOS || — || align=right | 2.4 km || 
|-id=655 bgcolor=#d6d6d6
| 71655 ||  || — || March 11, 2000 || Anderson Mesa || LONEOS || LIX || align=right | 13 km || 
|-id=656 bgcolor=#d6d6d6
| 71656 ||  || — || March 11, 2000 || Catalina || CSS || EOS || align=right | 5.9 km || 
|-id=657 bgcolor=#fefefe
| 71657 ||  || — || March 11, 2000 || Anderson Mesa || LONEOS || — || align=right | 1.8 km || 
|-id=658 bgcolor=#d6d6d6
| 71658 ||  || — || March 11, 2000 || Anderson Mesa || LONEOS || — || align=right | 7.5 km || 
|-id=659 bgcolor=#d6d6d6
| 71659 ||  || — || March 11, 2000 || Anderson Mesa || LONEOS || HYG || align=right | 5.7 km || 
|-id=660 bgcolor=#d6d6d6
| 71660 ||  || — || March 11, 2000 || Anderson Mesa || LONEOS || — || align=right | 9.1 km || 
|-id=661 bgcolor=#d6d6d6
| 71661 ||  || — || March 11, 2000 || Anderson Mesa || LONEOS || — || align=right | 7.2 km || 
|-id=662 bgcolor=#d6d6d6
| 71662 ||  || — || March 11, 2000 || Socorro || LINEAR || — || align=right | 6.1 km || 
|-id=663 bgcolor=#d6d6d6
| 71663 ||  || — || March 11, 2000 || Catalina || CSS || — || align=right | 7.2 km || 
|-id=664 bgcolor=#d6d6d6
| 71664 ||  || — || March 11, 2000 || Catalina || CSS || — || align=right | 10 km || 
|-id=665 bgcolor=#d6d6d6
| 71665 ||  || — || March 3, 2000 || Catalina || CSS || ALA || align=right | 11 km || 
|-id=666 bgcolor=#d6d6d6
| 71666 ||  || — || March 4, 2000 || Catalina || CSS || — || align=right | 12 km || 
|-id=667 bgcolor=#d6d6d6
| 71667 ||  || — || March 5, 2000 || Haleakala || NEAT || THM || align=right | 7.2 km || 
|-id=668 bgcolor=#d6d6d6
| 71668 ||  || — || March 6, 2000 || Haleakala || NEAT || — || align=right | 8.9 km || 
|-id=669 bgcolor=#d6d6d6
| 71669 Dodsonprince ||  ||  || March 11, 2000 || Catalina || CSS || — || align=right | 9.2 km || 
|-id=670 bgcolor=#E9E9E9
| 71670 ||  || — || March 12, 2000 || Anderson Mesa || LONEOS || JUN || align=right | 3.2 km || 
|-id=671 bgcolor=#d6d6d6
| 71671 ||  || — || March 4, 2000 || Socorro || LINEAR || — || align=right | 6.4 km || 
|-id=672 bgcolor=#E9E9E9
| 71672 ||  || — || March 4, 2000 || Socorro || LINEAR || — || align=right | 4.3 km || 
|-id=673 bgcolor=#d6d6d6
| 71673 ||  || — || March 4, 2000 || Socorro || LINEAR || EOS || align=right | 6.1 km || 
|-id=674 bgcolor=#d6d6d6
| 71674 ||  || — || March 4, 2000 || Socorro || LINEAR || CRO || align=right | 7.3 km || 
|-id=675 bgcolor=#d6d6d6
| 71675 ||  || — || March 4, 2000 || Socorro || LINEAR || NAE || align=right | 7.7 km || 
|-id=676 bgcolor=#d6d6d6
| 71676 ||  || — || March 4, 2000 || Socorro || LINEAR || TIR || align=right | 3.6 km || 
|-id=677 bgcolor=#d6d6d6
| 71677 ||  || — || March 5, 2000 || Socorro || LINEAR || — || align=right | 7.5 km || 
|-id=678 bgcolor=#d6d6d6
| 71678 ||  || — || March 1, 2000 || Kitt Peak || Spacewatch || — || align=right | 4.1 km || 
|-id=679 bgcolor=#d6d6d6
| 71679 ||  || — || March 4, 2000 || Socorro || LINEAR || EOS || align=right | 4.9 km || 
|-id=680 bgcolor=#d6d6d6
| 71680 ||  || — || March 15, 2000 || Socorro || LINEAR || — || align=right | 7.4 km || 
|-id=681 bgcolor=#d6d6d6
| 71681 ||  || — || March 25, 2000 || Kitt Peak || Spacewatch || THM || align=right | 7.7 km || 
|-id=682 bgcolor=#E9E9E9
| 71682 ||  || — || March 28, 2000 || Socorro || LINEAR || INO || align=right | 4.3 km || 
|-id=683 bgcolor=#E9E9E9
| 71683 ||  || — || March 28, 2000 || Socorro || LINEAR || — || align=right | 7.8 km || 
|-id=684 bgcolor=#d6d6d6
| 71684 ||  || — || March 28, 2000 || Socorro || LINEAR || HYG || align=right | 7.1 km || 
|-id=685 bgcolor=#d6d6d6
| 71685 ||  || — || March 29, 2000 || Socorro || LINEAR || — || align=right | 7.5 km || 
|-id=686 bgcolor=#d6d6d6
| 71686 ||  || — || March 27, 2000 || Anderson Mesa || LONEOS || HYG || align=right | 7.0 km || 
|-id=687 bgcolor=#d6d6d6
| 71687 ||  || — || March 29, 2000 || Socorro || LINEAR || — || align=right | 7.4 km || 
|-id=688 bgcolor=#d6d6d6
| 71688 ||  || — || March 29, 2000 || Socorro || LINEAR || ALA || align=right | 8.4 km || 
|-id=689 bgcolor=#d6d6d6
| 71689 ||  || — || March 29, 2000 || Socorro || LINEAR || — || align=right | 10 km || 
|-id=690 bgcolor=#E9E9E9
| 71690 ||  || — || March 29, 2000 || Socorro || LINEAR || — || align=right | 4.7 km || 
|-id=691 bgcolor=#d6d6d6
| 71691 ||  || — || March 29, 2000 || Socorro || LINEAR || — || align=right | 13 km || 
|-id=692 bgcolor=#d6d6d6
| 71692 ||  || — || March 28, 2000 || Socorro || LINEAR || — || align=right | 3.9 km || 
|-id=693 bgcolor=#d6d6d6
| 71693 ||  || — || March 29, 2000 || Socorro || LINEAR || URS || align=right | 9.9 km || 
|-id=694 bgcolor=#d6d6d6
| 71694 ||  || — || March 29, 2000 || Socorro || LINEAR || 2:1J || align=right | 7.7 km || 
|-id=695 bgcolor=#d6d6d6
| 71695 ||  || — || March 29, 2000 || Socorro || LINEAR || HYG || align=right | 8.5 km || 
|-id=696 bgcolor=#d6d6d6
| 71696 ||  || — || March 29, 2000 || Socorro || LINEAR || — || align=right | 7.7 km || 
|-id=697 bgcolor=#d6d6d6
| 71697 ||  || — || March 29, 2000 || Socorro || LINEAR || — || align=right | 2.3 km || 
|-id=698 bgcolor=#d6d6d6
| 71698 ||  || — || March 27, 2000 || Anderson Mesa || LONEOS || ALA || align=right | 8.5 km || 
|-id=699 bgcolor=#d6d6d6
| 71699 ||  || — || April 5, 2000 || Socorro || LINEAR || — || align=right | 5.0 km || 
|-id=700 bgcolor=#d6d6d6
| 71700 ||  || — || April 5, 2000 || Socorro || LINEAR || — || align=right | 3.6 km || 
|}

71701–71800 

|-bgcolor=#d6d6d6
| 71701 ||  || — || April 5, 2000 || Socorro || LINEAR || 3:2 || align=right | 9.7 km || 
|-id=702 bgcolor=#d6d6d6
| 71702 ||  || — || April 5, 2000 || Socorro || LINEAR || — || align=right | 7.8 km || 
|-id=703 bgcolor=#d6d6d6
| 71703 ||  || — || April 5, 2000 || Socorro || LINEAR || EOS || align=right | 4.9 km || 
|-id=704 bgcolor=#d6d6d6
| 71704 ||  || — || April 5, 2000 || Socorro || LINEAR || — || align=right | 7.5 km || 
|-id=705 bgcolor=#d6d6d6
| 71705 ||  || — || April 5, 2000 || Socorro || LINEAR || HYG || align=right | 6.2 km || 
|-id=706 bgcolor=#E9E9E9
| 71706 ||  || — || April 5, 2000 || Socorro || LINEAR || — || align=right | 6.1 km || 
|-id=707 bgcolor=#d6d6d6
| 71707 ||  || — || April 5, 2000 || Socorro || LINEAR || THM || align=right | 6.6 km || 
|-id=708 bgcolor=#d6d6d6
| 71708 ||  || — || April 5, 2000 || Socorro || LINEAR || — || align=right | 4.7 km || 
|-id=709 bgcolor=#d6d6d6
| 71709 ||  || — || April 6, 2000 || Socorro || LINEAR || — || align=right | 7.6 km || 
|-id=710 bgcolor=#E9E9E9
| 71710 ||  || — || April 2, 2000 || Socorro || LINEAR || — || align=right | 4.4 km || 
|-id=711 bgcolor=#d6d6d6
| 71711 ||  || — || April 3, 2000 || Socorro || LINEAR || — || align=right | 6.4 km || 
|-id=712 bgcolor=#d6d6d6
| 71712 ||  || — || April 6, 2000 || Socorro || LINEAR || — || align=right | 3.7 km || 
|-id=713 bgcolor=#d6d6d6
| 71713 ||  || — || April 7, 2000 || Socorro || LINEAR || 7:4 || align=right | 9.6 km || 
|-id=714 bgcolor=#fefefe
| 71714 ||  || — || April 7, 2000 || Socorro || LINEAR || V || align=right | 1.7 km || 
|-id=715 bgcolor=#d6d6d6
| 71715 ||  || — || April 7, 2000 || Socorro || LINEAR || — || align=right | 11 km || 
|-id=716 bgcolor=#d6d6d6
| 71716 ||  || — || April 5, 2000 || Socorro || LINEAR || THM || align=right | 7.7 km || 
|-id=717 bgcolor=#d6d6d6
| 71717 ||  || — || April 8, 2000 || Socorro || LINEAR || THM || align=right | 8.6 km || 
|-id=718 bgcolor=#d6d6d6
| 71718 ||  || — || April 7, 2000 || Socorro || LINEAR || TIR || align=right | 5.3 km || 
|-id=719 bgcolor=#E9E9E9
| 71719 ||  || — || April 4, 2000 || Anderson Mesa || LONEOS || — || align=right | 6.4 km || 
|-id=720 bgcolor=#E9E9E9
| 71720 ||  || — || April 4, 2000 || Anderson Mesa || LONEOS || — || align=right | 4.0 km || 
|-id=721 bgcolor=#d6d6d6
| 71721 ||  || — || April 4, 2000 || Anderson Mesa || LONEOS || — || align=right | 4.7 km || 
|-id=722 bgcolor=#d6d6d6
| 71722 ||  || — || April 4, 2000 || Socorro || LINEAR || — || align=right | 8.4 km || 
|-id=723 bgcolor=#d6d6d6
| 71723 ||  || — || April 2, 2000 || Anderson Mesa || LONEOS || — || align=right | 5.7 km || 
|-id=724 bgcolor=#d6d6d6
| 71724 ||  || — || April 4, 2000 || Anderson Mesa || LONEOS || SYL7:4 || align=right | 8.2 km || 
|-id=725 bgcolor=#d6d6d6
| 71725 ||  || — || April 27, 2000 || Socorro || LINEAR || THM || align=right | 6.8 km || 
|-id=726 bgcolor=#d6d6d6
| 71726 ||  || — || April 24, 2000 || Anderson Mesa || LONEOS || — || align=right | 9.7 km || 
|-id=727 bgcolor=#d6d6d6
| 71727 ||  || — || April 24, 2000 || Anderson Mesa || LONEOS || — || align=right | 16 km || 
|-id=728 bgcolor=#d6d6d6
| 71728 ||  || — || April 26, 2000 || Anderson Mesa || LONEOS || — || align=right | 4.7 km || 
|-id=729 bgcolor=#d6d6d6
| 71729 ||  || — || April 30, 2000 || Anderson Mesa || LONEOS || TIR || align=right | 4.7 km || 
|-id=730 bgcolor=#fefefe
| 71730 ||  || — || May 4, 2000 || Socorro || LINEAR || H || align=right | 1.1 km || 
|-id=731 bgcolor=#d6d6d6
| 71731 ||  || — || May 7, 2000 || Socorro || LINEAR || — || align=right | 11 km || 
|-id=732 bgcolor=#E9E9E9
| 71732 ||  || — || May 7, 2000 || Socorro || LINEAR || — || align=right | 2.3 km || 
|-id=733 bgcolor=#d6d6d6
| 71733 ||  || — || May 9, 2000 || Socorro || LINEAR || — || align=right | 10 km || 
|-id=734 bgcolor=#fefefe
| 71734 ||  || — || June 4, 2000 || Socorro || LINEAR || H || align=right | 1.6 km || 
|-id=735 bgcolor=#fefefe
| 71735 ||  || — || June 25, 2000 || Socorro || LINEAR || H || align=right | 1.5 km || 
|-id=736 bgcolor=#fefefe
| 71736 ||  || — || July 29, 2000 || Anderson Mesa || LONEOS || H || align=right | 1.2 km || 
|-id=737 bgcolor=#fefefe
| 71737 ||  || — || August 4, 2000 || Socorro || LINEAR || H || align=right | 1.6 km || 
|-id=738 bgcolor=#d6d6d6
| 71738 ||  || — || August 1, 2000 || Socorro || LINEAR || — || align=right | 5.9 km || 
|-id=739 bgcolor=#fefefe
| 71739 ||  || — || August 24, 2000 || Socorro || LINEAR || H || align=right | 1.8 km || 
|-id=740 bgcolor=#fefefe
| 71740 ||  || — || August 26, 2000 || Socorro || LINEAR || H || align=right | 1.4 km || 
|-id=741 bgcolor=#fefefe
| 71741 ||  || — || August 26, 2000 || Socorro || LINEAR || H || align=right | 2.1 km || 
|-id=742 bgcolor=#fefefe
| 71742 ||  || — || August 24, 2000 || Socorro || LINEAR || H || align=right | 1.0 km || 
|-id=743 bgcolor=#fefefe
| 71743 ||  || — || August 29, 2000 || Socorro || LINEAR || H || align=right | 1.5 km || 
|-id=744 bgcolor=#fefefe
| 71744 ||  || — || August 31, 2000 || Socorro || LINEAR || H || align=right | 1.1 km || 
|-id=745 bgcolor=#fefefe
| 71745 ||  || — || August 31, 2000 || Socorro || LINEAR || H || align=right | 1.4 km || 
|-id=746 bgcolor=#fefefe
| 71746 ||  || — || August 31, 2000 || Socorro || LINEAR || — || align=right | 2.5 km || 
|-id=747 bgcolor=#fefefe
| 71747 ||  || — || August 31, 2000 || Socorro || LINEAR || FLO || align=right | 1.5 km || 
|-id=748 bgcolor=#fefefe
| 71748 ||  || — || August 26, 2000 || Socorro || LINEAR || FLO || align=right | 2.6 km || 
|-id=749 bgcolor=#fefefe
| 71749 ||  || — || August 25, 2000 || Socorro || LINEAR || — || align=right | 2.3 km || 
|-id=750 bgcolor=#fefefe
| 71750 ||  || — || September 1, 2000 || Socorro || LINEAR || — || align=right | 1.7 km || 
|-id=751 bgcolor=#fefefe
| 71751 ||  || — || September 1, 2000 || Socorro || LINEAR || V || align=right | 2.4 km || 
|-id=752 bgcolor=#fefefe
| 71752 ||  || — || September 1, 2000 || Socorro || LINEAR || — || align=right | 2.0 km || 
|-id=753 bgcolor=#fefefe
| 71753 ||  || — || September 5, 2000 || Socorro || LINEAR || — || align=right | 2.6 km || 
|-id=754 bgcolor=#fefefe
| 71754 ||  || — || September 3, 2000 || Socorro || LINEAR || — || align=right | 3.3 km || 
|-id=755 bgcolor=#fefefe
| 71755 ||  || — || September 5, 2000 || Socorro || LINEAR || — || align=right | 1.9 km || 
|-id=756 bgcolor=#fefefe
| 71756 ||  || — || September 5, 2000 || Socorro || LINEAR || FLO || align=right | 2.7 km || 
|-id=757 bgcolor=#fefefe
| 71757 ||  || — || September 4, 2000 || Socorro || LINEAR || — || align=right | 1.8 km || 
|-id=758 bgcolor=#fefefe
| 71758 ||  || — || September 3, 2000 || Socorro || LINEAR || KLI || align=right | 5.7 km || 
|-id=759 bgcolor=#fefefe
| 71759 ||  || — || September 1, 2000 || Socorro || LINEAR || — || align=right | 2.7 km || 
|-id=760 bgcolor=#fefefe
| 71760 ||  || — || September 1, 2000 || Socorro || LINEAR || V || align=right | 2.1 km || 
|-id=761 bgcolor=#fefefe
| 71761 ||  || — || September 5, 2000 || Anderson Mesa || LONEOS || H || align=right | 1.5 km || 
|-id=762 bgcolor=#fefefe
| 71762 ||  || — || September 6, 2000 || Socorro || LINEAR || V || align=right | 1.5 km || 
|-id=763 bgcolor=#fefefe
| 71763 ||  || — || September 20, 2000 || Socorro || LINEAR || H || align=right | 1.8 km || 
|-id=764 bgcolor=#fefefe
| 71764 ||  || — || September 20, 2000 || Socorro || LINEAR || H || align=right | 1.5 km || 
|-id=765 bgcolor=#fefefe
| 71765 ||  || — || September 20, 2000 || Socorro || LINEAR || H || align=right | 1.7 km || 
|-id=766 bgcolor=#d6d6d6
| 71766 ||  || — || September 19, 2000 || Haleakala || NEAT || HYG || align=right | 5.8 km || 
|-id=767 bgcolor=#fefefe
| 71767 ||  || — || September 26, 2000 || Socorro || LINEAR || H || align=right | 2.3 km || 
|-id=768 bgcolor=#fefefe
| 71768 ||  || — || September 24, 2000 || Socorro || LINEAR || — || align=right | 1.6 km || 
|-id=769 bgcolor=#fefefe
| 71769 ||  || — || September 24, 2000 || Socorro || LINEAR || — || align=right | 1.3 km || 
|-id=770 bgcolor=#fefefe
| 71770 ||  || — || September 24, 2000 || Socorro || LINEAR || — || align=right | 2.1 km || 
|-id=771 bgcolor=#fefefe
| 71771 ||  || — || September 24, 2000 || Socorro || LINEAR || — || align=right | 1.5 km || 
|-id=772 bgcolor=#fefefe
| 71772 ||  || — || September 24, 2000 || Socorro || LINEAR || — || align=right | 2.1 km || 
|-id=773 bgcolor=#fefefe
| 71773 ||  || — || September 24, 2000 || Socorro || LINEAR || — || align=right | 3.3 km || 
|-id=774 bgcolor=#fefefe
| 71774 ||  || — || September 24, 2000 || Socorro || LINEAR || — || align=right | 1.6 km || 
|-id=775 bgcolor=#fefefe
| 71775 ||  || — || September 24, 2000 || Socorro || LINEAR || — || align=right | 1.0 km || 
|-id=776 bgcolor=#fefefe
| 71776 ||  || — || September 24, 2000 || Socorro || LINEAR || — || align=right | 1.9 km || 
|-id=777 bgcolor=#fefefe
| 71777 ||  || — || September 24, 2000 || Socorro || LINEAR || FLO || align=right | 2.5 km || 
|-id=778 bgcolor=#fefefe
| 71778 ||  || — || September 24, 2000 || Socorro || LINEAR || — || align=right | 1.6 km || 
|-id=779 bgcolor=#fefefe
| 71779 ||  || — || September 26, 2000 || Socorro || LINEAR || H || align=right | 1.2 km || 
|-id=780 bgcolor=#fefefe
| 71780 ||  || — || September 24, 2000 || Socorro || LINEAR || — || align=right | 1.4 km || 
|-id=781 bgcolor=#fefefe
| 71781 ||  || — || September 24, 2000 || Socorro || LINEAR || — || align=right | 1.5 km || 
|-id=782 bgcolor=#fefefe
| 71782 ||  || — || September 22, 2000 || Socorro || LINEAR || — || align=right | 2.0 km || 
|-id=783 bgcolor=#fefefe
| 71783 Izeryna ||  ||  || September 30, 2000 || Ondřejov || P. Pravec, P. Kušnirák || — || align=right | 1.3 km || 
|-id=784 bgcolor=#fefefe
| 71784 ||  || — || September 24, 2000 || Socorro || LINEAR || — || align=right | 2.7 km || 
|-id=785 bgcolor=#fefefe
| 71785 ||  || — || September 28, 2000 || Socorro || LINEAR || — || align=right | 2.9 km || 
|-id=786 bgcolor=#fefefe
| 71786 ||  || — || September 28, 2000 || Socorro || LINEAR || FLO || align=right | 1.6 km || 
|-id=787 bgcolor=#fefefe
| 71787 ||  || — || September 28, 2000 || Socorro || LINEAR || — || align=right | 1.5 km || 
|-id=788 bgcolor=#fefefe
| 71788 ||  || — || September 30, 2000 || Elmira || A. J. Cecce || — || align=right | 2.1 km || 
|-id=789 bgcolor=#fefefe
| 71789 ||  || — || September 21, 2000 || Haleakala || NEAT || — || align=right | 1.4 km || 
|-id=790 bgcolor=#fefefe
| 71790 ||  || — || September 24, 2000 || Socorro || LINEAR || — || align=right | 1.5 km || 
|-id=791 bgcolor=#fefefe
| 71791 ||  || — || September 24, 2000 || Socorro || LINEAR || — || align=right | 1.6 km || 
|-id=792 bgcolor=#fefefe
| 71792 ||  || — || September 25, 2000 || Socorro || LINEAR || — || align=right | 1.8 km || 
|-id=793 bgcolor=#fefefe
| 71793 ||  || — || September 27, 2000 || Socorro || LINEAR || — || align=right | 1.3 km || 
|-id=794 bgcolor=#E9E9E9
| 71794 ||  || — || September 27, 2000 || Socorro || LINEAR || EUN || align=right | 4.0 km || 
|-id=795 bgcolor=#fefefe
| 71795 ||  || — || September 28, 2000 || Socorro || LINEAR || — || align=right | 1.8 km || 
|-id=796 bgcolor=#fefefe
| 71796 ||  || — || September 28, 2000 || Socorro || LINEAR || — || align=right | 1.4 km || 
|-id=797 bgcolor=#fefefe
| 71797 ||  || — || September 28, 2000 || Socorro || LINEAR || — || align=right | 1.2 km || 
|-id=798 bgcolor=#fefefe
| 71798 ||  || — || September 22, 2000 || Socorro || LINEAR || H || align=right | 1.3 km || 
|-id=799 bgcolor=#fefefe
| 71799 ||  || — || September 24, 2000 || Socorro || LINEAR || — || align=right | 1.7 km || 
|-id=800 bgcolor=#d6d6d6
| 71800 ||  || — || September 26, 2000 || Socorro || LINEAR || — || align=right | 5.5 km || 
|}

71801–71900 

|-bgcolor=#fefefe
| 71801 ||  || — || September 26, 2000 || Socorro || LINEAR || — || align=right | 1.6 km || 
|-id=802 bgcolor=#fefefe
| 71802 ||  || — || September 28, 2000 || Socorro || LINEAR || — || align=right | 1.3 km || 
|-id=803 bgcolor=#fefefe
| 71803 ||  || — || September 28, 2000 || Socorro || LINEAR || FLO || align=right | 2.8 km || 
|-id=804 bgcolor=#fefefe
| 71804 ||  || — || September 30, 2000 || Socorro || LINEAR || — || align=right | 1.4 km || 
|-id=805 bgcolor=#fefefe
| 71805 ||  || — || September 27, 2000 || Socorro || LINEAR || FLO || align=right | 1.6 km || 
|-id=806 bgcolor=#fefefe
| 71806 ||  || — || September 27, 2000 || Socorro || LINEAR || — || align=right | 3.2 km || 
|-id=807 bgcolor=#fefefe
| 71807 ||  || — || September 28, 2000 || Socorro || LINEAR || — || align=right | 1.9 km || 
|-id=808 bgcolor=#fefefe
| 71808 ||  || — || September 30, 2000 || Socorro || LINEAR || — || align=right | 4.9 km || 
|-id=809 bgcolor=#fefefe
| 71809 ||  || — || September 27, 2000 || Socorro || LINEAR || — || align=right | 5.0 km || 
|-id=810 bgcolor=#fefefe
| 71810 ||  || — || October 1, 2000 || Socorro || LINEAR || — || align=right | 1.4 km || 
|-id=811 bgcolor=#fefefe
| 71811 ||  || — || October 3, 2000 || Socorro || LINEAR || FLO || align=right | 1.3 km || 
|-id=812 bgcolor=#fefefe
| 71812 ||  || — || October 2, 2000 || Socorro || LINEAR || — || align=right | 2.0 km || 
|-id=813 bgcolor=#fefefe
| 71813 || 2000 UZ || — || October 21, 2000 || Višnjan Observatory || K. Korlević || FLO || align=right | 1.4 km || 
|-id=814 bgcolor=#fefefe
| 71814 ||  || — || October 22, 2000 || Bergisch Gladbach || W. Bickel || — || align=right | 2.0 km || 
|-id=815 bgcolor=#fefefe
| 71815 ||  || — || October 24, 2000 || Socorro || LINEAR || — || align=right | 4.2 km || 
|-id=816 bgcolor=#fefefe
| 71816 ||  || — || October 24, 2000 || Socorro || LINEAR || — || align=right | 2.3 km || 
|-id=817 bgcolor=#fefefe
| 71817 ||  || — || October 25, 2000 || Socorro || LINEAR || V || align=right | 1.7 km || 
|-id=818 bgcolor=#fefefe
| 71818 ||  || — || October 21, 2000 || Socorro || LINEAR || H || align=right | 1.9 km || 
|-id=819 bgcolor=#fefefe
| 71819 ||  || — || October 24, 2000 || Socorro || LINEAR || — || align=right | 1.3 km || 
|-id=820 bgcolor=#fefefe
| 71820 ||  || — || October 24, 2000 || Socorro || LINEAR || — || align=right | 2.0 km || 
|-id=821 bgcolor=#fefefe
| 71821 ||  || — || October 24, 2000 || Socorro || LINEAR || — || align=right | 1.7 km || 
|-id=822 bgcolor=#fefefe
| 71822 ||  || — || October 24, 2000 || Socorro || LINEAR || NYS || align=right | 3.4 km || 
|-id=823 bgcolor=#fefefe
| 71823 ||  || — || October 24, 2000 || Socorro || LINEAR || — || align=right | 1.6 km || 
|-id=824 bgcolor=#fefefe
| 71824 ||  || — || October 24, 2000 || Socorro || LINEAR || — || align=right | 2.3 km || 
|-id=825 bgcolor=#fefefe
| 71825 ||  || — || October 24, 2000 || Socorro || LINEAR || V || align=right | 1.8 km || 
|-id=826 bgcolor=#fefefe
| 71826 ||  || — || October 24, 2000 || Socorro || LINEAR || — || align=right | 2.2 km || 
|-id=827 bgcolor=#fefefe
| 71827 ||  || — || October 24, 2000 || Socorro || LINEAR || — || align=right | 1.8 km || 
|-id=828 bgcolor=#fefefe
| 71828 ||  || — || October 24, 2000 || Socorro || LINEAR || — || align=right | 1.8 km || 
|-id=829 bgcolor=#fefefe
| 71829 ||  || — || October 24, 2000 || Socorro || LINEAR || V || align=right | 1.9 km || 
|-id=830 bgcolor=#fefefe
| 71830 ||  || — || October 24, 2000 || Socorro || LINEAR || — || align=right | 1.8 km || 
|-id=831 bgcolor=#fefefe
| 71831 ||  || — || October 24, 2000 || Socorro || LINEAR || — || align=right | 2.0 km || 
|-id=832 bgcolor=#fefefe
| 71832 ||  || — || October 25, 2000 || Socorro || LINEAR || — || align=right | 2.8 km || 
|-id=833 bgcolor=#fefefe
| 71833 ||  || — || October 25, 2000 || Socorro || LINEAR || — || align=right | 1.6 km || 
|-id=834 bgcolor=#fefefe
| 71834 ||  || — || October 25, 2000 || Socorro || LINEAR || V || align=right | 1.2 km || 
|-id=835 bgcolor=#fefefe
| 71835 ||  || — || October 25, 2000 || Socorro || LINEAR || V || align=right | 1.2 km || 
|-id=836 bgcolor=#fefefe
| 71836 ||  || — || October 25, 2000 || Socorro || LINEAR || — || align=right | 2.4 km || 
|-id=837 bgcolor=#fefefe
| 71837 ||  || — || October 25, 2000 || Socorro || LINEAR || — || align=right | 2.4 km || 
|-id=838 bgcolor=#fefefe
| 71838 ||  || — || October 25, 2000 || Socorro || LINEAR || — || align=right | 2.0 km || 
|-id=839 bgcolor=#fefefe
| 71839 ||  || — || October 25, 2000 || Socorro || LINEAR || FLO || align=right | 1.3 km || 
|-id=840 bgcolor=#fefefe
| 71840 ||  || — || October 30, 2000 || Socorro || LINEAR || — || align=right | 2.1 km || 
|-id=841 bgcolor=#fefefe
| 71841 ||  || — || October 24, 2000 || Socorro || LINEAR || FLO || align=right | 1.9 km || 
|-id=842 bgcolor=#fefefe
| 71842 ||  || — || October 24, 2000 || Socorro || LINEAR || FLO || align=right | 1.6 km || 
|-id=843 bgcolor=#fefefe
| 71843 ||  || — || October 24, 2000 || Socorro || LINEAR || — || align=right | 1.8 km || 
|-id=844 bgcolor=#fefefe
| 71844 ||  || — || October 24, 2000 || Socorro || LINEAR || — || align=right | 1.9 km || 
|-id=845 bgcolor=#fefefe
| 71845 ||  || — || October 25, 2000 || Socorro || LINEAR || — || align=right | 4.2 km || 
|-id=846 bgcolor=#fefefe
| 71846 ||  || — || October 25, 2000 || Socorro || LINEAR || V || align=right | 1.6 km || 
|-id=847 bgcolor=#fefefe
| 71847 ||  || — || October 25, 2000 || Socorro || LINEAR || V || align=right | 1.7 km || 
|-id=848 bgcolor=#fefefe
| 71848 ||  || — || October 25, 2000 || Socorro || LINEAR || — || align=right | 2.0 km || 
|-id=849 bgcolor=#fefefe
| 71849 ||  || — || October 25, 2000 || Socorro || LINEAR || — || align=right | 2.0 km || 
|-id=850 bgcolor=#fefefe
| 71850 ||  || — || October 25, 2000 || Socorro || LINEAR || — || align=right | 1.9 km || 
|-id=851 bgcolor=#fefefe
| 71851 ||  || — || October 25, 2000 || Socorro || LINEAR || — || align=right | 2.1 km || 
|-id=852 bgcolor=#fefefe
| 71852 ||  || — || October 29, 2000 || Socorro || LINEAR || V || align=right | 1.8 km || 
|-id=853 bgcolor=#fefefe
| 71853 ||  || — || October 31, 2000 || Socorro || LINEAR || FLO || align=right | 1.4 km || 
|-id=854 bgcolor=#fefefe
| 71854 ||  || — || October 31, 2000 || Socorro || LINEAR || FLO || align=right | 1.2 km || 
|-id=855 bgcolor=#E9E9E9
| 71855 ||  || — || October 31, 2000 || Mallorca || S. Sánchez, M. Blasco || — || align=right | 2.2 km || 
|-id=856 bgcolor=#fefefe
| 71856 ||  || — || November 1, 2000 || Socorro || LINEAR || FLO || align=right | 1.3 km || 
|-id=857 bgcolor=#fefefe
| 71857 ||  || — || November 1, 2000 || Socorro || LINEAR || — || align=right | 1.5 km || 
|-id=858 bgcolor=#fefefe
| 71858 ||  || — || November 1, 2000 || Socorro || LINEAR || — || align=right | 1.3 km || 
|-id=859 bgcolor=#fefefe
| 71859 ||  || — || November 1, 2000 || Socorro || LINEAR || FLO || align=right | 1.5 km || 
|-id=860 bgcolor=#fefefe
| 71860 ||  || — || November 1, 2000 || Socorro || LINEAR || — || align=right | 2.0 km || 
|-id=861 bgcolor=#fefefe
| 71861 ||  || — || November 1, 2000 || Socorro || LINEAR || V || align=right | 1.6 km || 
|-id=862 bgcolor=#fefefe
| 71862 ||  || — || November 1, 2000 || Socorro || LINEAR || FLO || align=right | 2.0 km || 
|-id=863 bgcolor=#fefefe
| 71863 ||  || — || November 1, 2000 || Socorro || LINEAR || V || align=right | 1.4 km || 
|-id=864 bgcolor=#fefefe
| 71864 ||  || — || November 1, 2000 || Socorro || LINEAR || — || align=right | 2.0 km || 
|-id=865 bgcolor=#fefefe
| 71865 ||  || — || November 1, 2000 || Socorro || LINEAR || V || align=right | 1.8 km || 
|-id=866 bgcolor=#fefefe
| 71866 ||  || — || November 1, 2000 || Socorro || LINEAR || FLO || align=right | 1.7 km || 
|-id=867 bgcolor=#fefefe
| 71867 ||  || — || November 1, 2000 || Socorro || LINEAR || FLO || align=right | 1.6 km || 
|-id=868 bgcolor=#fefefe
| 71868 ||  || — || November 1, 2000 || Socorro || LINEAR || FLO || align=right | 2.8 km || 
|-id=869 bgcolor=#fefefe
| 71869 ||  || — || November 1, 2000 || Socorro || LINEAR || — || align=right | 2.0 km || 
|-id=870 bgcolor=#fefefe
| 71870 ||  || — || November 1, 2000 || Socorro || LINEAR || — || align=right | 1.8 km || 
|-id=871 bgcolor=#fefefe
| 71871 ||  || — || November 1, 2000 || Socorro || LINEAR || — || align=right | 2.3 km || 
|-id=872 bgcolor=#fefefe
| 71872 ||  || — || November 1, 2000 || Socorro || LINEAR || NYS || align=right | 3.4 km || 
|-id=873 bgcolor=#fefefe
| 71873 ||  || — || November 3, 2000 || Socorro || LINEAR || — || align=right | 4.2 km || 
|-id=874 bgcolor=#fefefe
| 71874 ||  || — || November 3, 2000 || Socorro || LINEAR || V || align=right | 2.4 km || 
|-id=875 bgcolor=#fefefe
| 71875 ||  || — || November 2, 2000 || Socorro || LINEAR || — || align=right | 1.8 km || 
|-id=876 bgcolor=#fefefe
| 71876 ||  || — || November 2, 2000 || Socorro || LINEAR || FLO || align=right | 1.6 km || 
|-id=877 bgcolor=#fefefe
| 71877 ||  || — || November 2, 2000 || Socorro || LINEAR || V || align=right | 2.0 km || 
|-id=878 bgcolor=#fefefe
| 71878 ||  || — || November 2, 2000 || Socorro || LINEAR || — || align=right | 2.0 km || 
|-id=879 bgcolor=#fefefe
| 71879 ||  || — || November 2, 2000 || Socorro || LINEAR || — || align=right | 2.0 km || 
|-id=880 bgcolor=#fefefe
| 71880 ||  || — || November 3, 2000 || Socorro || LINEAR || — || align=right | 1.5 km || 
|-id=881 bgcolor=#fefefe
| 71881 ||  || — || November 3, 2000 || Socorro || LINEAR || V || align=right | 2.4 km || 
|-id=882 bgcolor=#fefefe
| 71882 ||  || — || November 3, 2000 || Socorro || LINEAR || V || align=right | 2.3 km || 
|-id=883 bgcolor=#fefefe
| 71883 ||  || — || November 3, 2000 || Socorro || LINEAR || FLO || align=right | 1.4 km || 
|-id=884 bgcolor=#fefefe
| 71884 ||  || — || November 6, 2000 || Socorro || LINEAR || — || align=right | 3.8 km || 
|-id=885 bgcolor=#fefefe
| 71885 Denning || 2000 WD ||  || November 16, 2000 || Kitt Peak || Spacewatch || FLO || align=right | 2.0 km || 
|-id=886 bgcolor=#fefefe
| 71886 || 2000 WH || — || November 16, 2000 || Kitt Peak || Spacewatch || — || align=right | 3.4 km || 
|-id=887 bgcolor=#fefefe
| 71887 || 2000 WW || — || November 17, 2000 || Desert Beaver || W. K. Y. Yeung || FLO || align=right | 2.1 km || 
|-id=888 bgcolor=#fefefe
| 71888 ||  || — || November 19, 2000 || Socorro || LINEAR || FLO || align=right | 1.9 km || 
|-id=889 bgcolor=#fefefe
| 71889 ||  || — || November 19, 2000 || Socorro || LINEAR || — || align=right | 1.8 km || 
|-id=890 bgcolor=#fefefe
| 71890 ||  || — || November 20, 2000 || Farpoint || Farpoint Obs. || — || align=right | 1.3 km || 
|-id=891 bgcolor=#fefefe
| 71891 ||  || — || November 19, 2000 || Socorro || LINEAR || — || align=right | 2.0 km || 
|-id=892 bgcolor=#fefefe
| 71892 ||  || — || November 19, 2000 || Socorro || LINEAR || V || align=right | 1.6 km || 
|-id=893 bgcolor=#fefefe
| 71893 ||  || — || November 20, 2000 || Socorro || LINEAR || — || align=right | 1.4 km || 
|-id=894 bgcolor=#fefefe
| 71894 ||  || — || November 20, 2000 || Desert Beaver || W. K. Y. Yeung || — || align=right | 2.7 km || 
|-id=895 bgcolor=#fefefe
| 71895 ||  || — || November 23, 2000 || Desert Beaver || W. K. Y. Yeung || FLO || align=right | 1.7 km || 
|-id=896 bgcolor=#fefefe
| 71896 ||  || — || November 22, 2000 || Kitt Peak || Spacewatch || NYS || align=right | 2.2 km || 
|-id=897 bgcolor=#fefefe
| 71897 ||  || — || November 20, 2000 || Socorro || LINEAR || FLO || align=right | 2.0 km || 
|-id=898 bgcolor=#fefefe
| 71898 ||  || — || November 20, 2000 || Socorro || LINEAR || — || align=right | 1.8 km || 
|-id=899 bgcolor=#fefefe
| 71899 ||  || — || November 21, 2000 || Socorro || LINEAR || — || align=right | 1.6 km || 
|-id=900 bgcolor=#fefefe
| 71900 ||  || — || November 21, 2000 || Socorro || LINEAR || V || align=right | 2.2 km || 
|}

71901–72000 

|-bgcolor=#fefefe
| 71901 ||  || — || November 20, 2000 || Socorro || LINEAR || V || align=right | 2.2 km || 
|-id=902 bgcolor=#fefefe
| 71902 ||  || — || November 20, 2000 || Socorro || LINEAR || — || align=right | 2.3 km || 
|-id=903 bgcolor=#fefefe
| 71903 ||  || — || November 21, 2000 || Socorro || LINEAR || V || align=right | 1.8 km || 
|-id=904 bgcolor=#fefefe
| 71904 ||  || — || November 26, 2000 || Desert Beaver || W. K. Y. Yeung || FLO || align=right | 2.3 km || 
|-id=905 bgcolor=#E9E9E9
| 71905 ||  || — || November 26, 2000 || Desert Beaver || W. K. Y. Yeung || — || align=right | 6.3 km || 
|-id=906 bgcolor=#fefefe
| 71906 ||  || — || November 20, 2000 || Socorro || LINEAR || — || align=right | 1.6 km || 
|-id=907 bgcolor=#fefefe
| 71907 ||  || — || November 20, 2000 || Socorro || LINEAR || — || align=right | 2.6 km || 
|-id=908 bgcolor=#fefefe
| 71908 ||  || — || November 20, 2000 || Socorro || LINEAR || — || align=right | 3.0 km || 
|-id=909 bgcolor=#fefefe
| 71909 ||  || — || November 20, 2000 || Socorro || LINEAR || V || align=right | 1.1 km || 
|-id=910 bgcolor=#fefefe
| 71910 ||  || — || November 20, 2000 || Socorro || LINEAR || — || align=right | 1.8 km || 
|-id=911 bgcolor=#fefefe
| 71911 ||  || — || November 21, 2000 || Socorro || LINEAR || FLO || align=right | 1.2 km || 
|-id=912 bgcolor=#fefefe
| 71912 ||  || — || November 21, 2000 || Socorro || LINEAR || — || align=right | 2.0 km || 
|-id=913 bgcolor=#fefefe
| 71913 ||  || — || November 21, 2000 || Socorro || LINEAR || — || align=right | 1.7 km || 
|-id=914 bgcolor=#fefefe
| 71914 ||  || — || November 21, 2000 || Socorro || LINEAR || — || align=right | 1.9 km || 
|-id=915 bgcolor=#fefefe
| 71915 ||  || — || November 21, 2000 || Socorro || LINEAR || — || align=right | 4.1 km || 
|-id=916 bgcolor=#fefefe
| 71916 ||  || — || November 21, 2000 || Socorro || LINEAR || — || align=right | 2.4 km || 
|-id=917 bgcolor=#fefefe
| 71917 ||  || — || November 21, 2000 || Socorro || LINEAR || — || align=right | 2.8 km || 
|-id=918 bgcolor=#fefefe
| 71918 ||  || — || November 20, 2000 || Socorro || LINEAR || — || align=right | 2.5 km || 
|-id=919 bgcolor=#fefefe
| 71919 ||  || — || November 20, 2000 || Socorro || LINEAR || NYS || align=right | 1.9 km || 
|-id=920 bgcolor=#E9E9E9
| 71920 ||  || — || November 20, 2000 || Socorro || LINEAR || MAR || align=right | 3.0 km || 
|-id=921 bgcolor=#fefefe
| 71921 ||  || — || November 20, 2000 || Socorro || LINEAR || — || align=right | 2.1 km || 
|-id=922 bgcolor=#E9E9E9
| 71922 ||  || — || November 20, 2000 || Socorro || LINEAR || — || align=right | 2.9 km || 
|-id=923 bgcolor=#fefefe
| 71923 ||  || — || November 20, 2000 || Socorro || LINEAR || — || align=right | 2.8 km || 
|-id=924 bgcolor=#fefefe
| 71924 ||  || — || November 20, 2000 || Socorro || LINEAR || — || align=right | 5.0 km || 
|-id=925 bgcolor=#fefefe
| 71925 ||  || — || November 21, 2000 || Socorro || LINEAR || — || align=right | 1.7 km || 
|-id=926 bgcolor=#fefefe
| 71926 ||  || — || November 21, 2000 || Socorro || LINEAR || fast? || align=right | 1.5 km || 
|-id=927 bgcolor=#fefefe
| 71927 ||  || — || November 21, 2000 || Socorro || LINEAR || NYS || align=right | 1.8 km || 
|-id=928 bgcolor=#fefefe
| 71928 ||  || — || November 21, 2000 || Socorro || LINEAR || FLO || align=right | 2.1 km || 
|-id=929 bgcolor=#fefefe
| 71929 ||  || — || November 21, 2000 || Socorro || LINEAR || — || align=right | 2.3 km || 
|-id=930 bgcolor=#fefefe
| 71930 ||  || — || November 21, 2000 || Socorro || LINEAR || — || align=right | 2.5 km || 
|-id=931 bgcolor=#fefefe
| 71931 ||  || — || November 21, 2000 || Socorro || LINEAR || — || align=right | 1.6 km || 
|-id=932 bgcolor=#fefefe
| 71932 ||  || — || November 21, 2000 || Socorro || LINEAR || ERI || align=right | 4.4 km || 
|-id=933 bgcolor=#fefefe
| 71933 ||  || — || November 21, 2000 || Socorro || LINEAR || — || align=right | 1.9 km || 
|-id=934 bgcolor=#fefefe
| 71934 ||  || — || November 26, 2000 || Desert Beaver || W. K. Y. Yeung || NYS || align=right | 5.1 km || 
|-id=935 bgcolor=#fefefe
| 71935 ||  || — || November 28, 2000 || Haleakala || NEAT || H || align=right | 1.6 km || 
|-id=936 bgcolor=#E9E9E9
| 71936 ||  || — || November 20, 2000 || Anderson Mesa || LONEOS || EUN || align=right | 3.8 km || 
|-id=937 bgcolor=#fefefe
| 71937 ||  || — || November 19, 2000 || Socorro || LINEAR || FLO || align=right | 1.6 km || 
|-id=938 bgcolor=#fefefe
| 71938 ||  || — || November 20, 2000 || Socorro || LINEAR || FLO || align=right | 1.8 km || 
|-id=939 bgcolor=#fefefe
| 71939 ||  || — || November 20, 2000 || Socorro || LINEAR || — || align=right | 1.7 km || 
|-id=940 bgcolor=#fefefe
| 71940 ||  || — || November 20, 2000 || Socorro || LINEAR || — || align=right | 2.8 km || 
|-id=941 bgcolor=#fefefe
| 71941 ||  || — || November 20, 2000 || Socorro || LINEAR || — || align=right | 1.9 km || 
|-id=942 bgcolor=#fefefe
| 71942 ||  || — || November 20, 2000 || Socorro || LINEAR || — || align=right | 1.6 km || 
|-id=943 bgcolor=#fefefe
| 71943 ||  || — || November 20, 2000 || Socorro || LINEAR || — || align=right | 1.6 km || 
|-id=944 bgcolor=#fefefe
| 71944 ||  || — || November 20, 2000 || Socorro || LINEAR || — || align=right | 3.6 km || 
|-id=945 bgcolor=#E9E9E9
| 71945 ||  || — || November 20, 2000 || Socorro || LINEAR || — || align=right | 3.9 km || 
|-id=946 bgcolor=#fefefe
| 71946 ||  || — || November 20, 2000 || Socorro || LINEAR || V || align=right | 1.4 km || 
|-id=947 bgcolor=#fefefe
| 71947 ||  || — || November 20, 2000 || Socorro || LINEAR || — || align=right | 2.6 km || 
|-id=948 bgcolor=#fefefe
| 71948 ||  || — || November 20, 2000 || Socorro || LINEAR || FLO || align=right | 1.9 km || 
|-id=949 bgcolor=#fefefe
| 71949 ||  || — || November 21, 2000 || Socorro || LINEAR || — || align=right | 2.4 km || 
|-id=950 bgcolor=#fefefe
| 71950 ||  || — || November 21, 2000 || Socorro || LINEAR || V || align=right | 2.2 km || 
|-id=951 bgcolor=#fefefe
| 71951 ||  || — || November 21, 2000 || Socorro || LINEAR || FLO || align=right | 1.8 km || 
|-id=952 bgcolor=#fefefe
| 71952 ||  || — || November 21, 2000 || Socorro || LINEAR || — || align=right | 2.6 km || 
|-id=953 bgcolor=#fefefe
| 71953 ||  || — || November 21, 2000 || Socorro || LINEAR || — || align=right | 4.2 km || 
|-id=954 bgcolor=#fefefe
| 71954 ||  || — || November 24, 2000 || Kitt Peak || Spacewatch || V || align=right | 1.4 km || 
|-id=955 bgcolor=#fefefe
| 71955 ||  || — || November 26, 2000 || Needville || Needville Obs. || — || align=right | 1.5 km || 
|-id=956 bgcolor=#E9E9E9
| 71956 ||  || — || November 30, 2000 || Farpoint || G. Hug || — || align=right | 2.5 km || 
|-id=957 bgcolor=#fefefe
| 71957 ||  || — || November 20, 2000 || Socorro || LINEAR || V || align=right | 1.5 km || 
|-id=958 bgcolor=#fefefe
| 71958 ||  || — || November 20, 2000 || Socorro || LINEAR || FLO || align=right | 1.3 km || 
|-id=959 bgcolor=#fefefe
| 71959 ||  || — || November 20, 2000 || Socorro || LINEAR || — || align=right | 1.5 km || 
|-id=960 bgcolor=#fefefe
| 71960 ||  || — || November 20, 2000 || Socorro || LINEAR || — || align=right | 2.2 km || 
|-id=961 bgcolor=#fefefe
| 71961 ||  || — || November 20, 2000 || Socorro || LINEAR || — || align=right | 1.4 km || 
|-id=962 bgcolor=#fefefe
| 71962 ||  || — || November 20, 2000 || Socorro || LINEAR || NYS || align=right | 2.6 km || 
|-id=963 bgcolor=#fefefe
| 71963 ||  || — || November 20, 2000 || Socorro || LINEAR || — || align=right | 2.6 km || 
|-id=964 bgcolor=#fefefe
| 71964 ||  || — || November 20, 2000 || Socorro || LINEAR || V || align=right | 1.6 km || 
|-id=965 bgcolor=#fefefe
| 71965 ||  || — || November 20, 2000 || Socorro || LINEAR || — || align=right | 2.3 km || 
|-id=966 bgcolor=#fefefe
| 71966 ||  || — || November 20, 2000 || Socorro || LINEAR || CIM || align=right | 7.1 km || 
|-id=967 bgcolor=#fefefe
| 71967 ||  || — || November 20, 2000 || Socorro || LINEAR || FLO || align=right | 2.2 km || 
|-id=968 bgcolor=#fefefe
| 71968 ||  || — || November 20, 2000 || Socorro || LINEAR || — || align=right | 1.8 km || 
|-id=969 bgcolor=#fefefe
| 71969 ||  || — || November 29, 2000 || Socorro || LINEAR || — || align=right | 2.2 km || 
|-id=970 bgcolor=#fefefe
| 71970 ||  || — || November 29, 2000 || Socorro || LINEAR || — || align=right | 3.4 km || 
|-id=971 bgcolor=#fefefe
| 71971 Lindaketcham ||  ||  || November 25, 2000 || Carbuncle Hill || D. P. Pray || — || align=right | 2.2 km || 
|-id=972 bgcolor=#fefefe
| 71972 ||  || — || November 16, 2000 || Kitt Peak || Spacewatch || — || align=right | 2.0 km || 
|-id=973 bgcolor=#fefefe
| 71973 ||  || — || November 18, 2000 || Kitt Peak || Spacewatch || FLO || align=right | 1.9 km || 
|-id=974 bgcolor=#fefefe
| 71974 ||  || — || November 20, 2000 || Anderson Mesa || LONEOS || — || align=right | 2.2 km || 
|-id=975 bgcolor=#fefefe
| 71975 ||  || — || November 19, 2000 || Socorro || LINEAR || — || align=right | 4.8 km || 
|-id=976 bgcolor=#fefefe
| 71976 ||  || — || November 20, 2000 || Socorro || LINEAR || — || align=right | 1.6 km || 
|-id=977 bgcolor=#fefefe
| 71977 ||  || — || November 20, 2000 || Socorro || LINEAR || — || align=right | 2.3 km || 
|-id=978 bgcolor=#fefefe
| 71978 ||  || — || November 20, 2000 || Anderson Mesa || LONEOS || — || align=right | 1.5 km || 
|-id=979 bgcolor=#fefefe
| 71979 ||  || — || November 20, 2000 || Socorro || LINEAR || — || align=right | 2.9 km || 
|-id=980 bgcolor=#fefefe
| 71980 ||  || — || November 29, 2000 || Socorro || LINEAR || — || align=right | 1.7 km || 
|-id=981 bgcolor=#fefefe
| 71981 ||  || — || November 29, 2000 || Socorro || LINEAR || — || align=right | 1.5 km || 
|-id=982 bgcolor=#fefefe
| 71982 ||  || — || November 30, 2000 || Socorro || LINEAR || — || align=right | 2.2 km || 
|-id=983 bgcolor=#fefefe
| 71983 ||  || — || November 30, 2000 || Socorro || LINEAR || V || align=right | 1.8 km || 
|-id=984 bgcolor=#fefefe
| 71984 ||  || — || November 30, 2000 || Socorro || LINEAR || FLO || align=right | 1.9 km || 
|-id=985 bgcolor=#fefefe
| 71985 ||  || — || November 27, 2000 || Socorro || LINEAR || — || align=right | 1.6 km || 
|-id=986 bgcolor=#fefefe
| 71986 ||  || — || November 30, 2000 || Socorro || LINEAR || V || align=right | 1.7 km || 
|-id=987 bgcolor=#fefefe
| 71987 ||  || — || November 20, 2000 || Anderson Mesa || LONEOS || V || align=right | 1.6 km || 
|-id=988 bgcolor=#fefefe
| 71988 ||  || — || November 21, 2000 || Socorro || LINEAR || — || align=right | 2.7 km || 
|-id=989 bgcolor=#fefefe
| 71989 ||  || — || November 24, 2000 || Anderson Mesa || LONEOS || — || align=right | 1.8 km || 
|-id=990 bgcolor=#fefefe
| 71990 ||  || — || November 24, 2000 || Anderson Mesa || LONEOS || FLO || align=right | 1.6 km || 
|-id=991 bgcolor=#fefefe
| 71991 ||  || — || November 25, 2000 || Anderson Mesa || LONEOS || — || align=right | 2.3 km || 
|-id=992 bgcolor=#fefefe
| 71992 ||  || — || November 25, 2000 || Anderson Mesa || LONEOS || FLO || align=right | 2.3 km || 
|-id=993 bgcolor=#fefefe
| 71993 ||  || — || November 25, 2000 || Anderson Mesa || LONEOS || NYS || align=right | 1.6 km || 
|-id=994 bgcolor=#fefefe
| 71994 ||  || — || November 27, 2000 || Socorro || LINEAR || — || align=right | 2.7 km || 
|-id=995 bgcolor=#fefefe
| 71995 ||  || — || November 27, 2000 || Kitt Peak || Spacewatch || NYS || align=right | 3.1 km || 
|-id=996 bgcolor=#fefefe
| 71996 ||  || — || November 28, 2000 || Kitt Peak || Spacewatch || V || align=right | 1.9 km || 
|-id=997 bgcolor=#FA8072
| 71997 ||  || — || November 28, 2000 || Kitt Peak || Spacewatch || — || align=right | 1.9 km || 
|-id=998 bgcolor=#E9E9E9
| 71998 ||  || — || November 26, 2000 || Socorro || LINEAR || — || align=right | 3.1 km || 
|-id=999 bgcolor=#fefefe
| 71999 ||  || — || November 29, 2000 || Socorro || LINEAR || FLO || align=right | 1.4 km || 
|-id=000 bgcolor=#fefefe
| 72000 ||  || — || November 27, 2000 || Socorro || LINEAR || — || align=right | 1.9 km || 
|}

References

External links 
 Discovery Circumstances: Numbered Minor Planets (70001)–(75000) (IAU Minor Planet Center)

0071